= Deaths in August 2024 =

The following is a list of notable deaths in August 2024.

Entries for each day are listed alphabetically by surname. A typical entry lists information in the following sequence:

- Name, age, country of citizenship at birth, subsequent country of citizenship (if applicable), reason for notability, cause of death (if known), and reference.

== August 2024 ==
=== 1 ===
- Jürgen Ahrend, 94, German pipe organ builder (Rysum organ, Schnitker organ (Groningen), Schnitger organ (Hamburg)).
- Rex Baxter, 88, American professional golfer.
- Steinar Bjølbakk, 77, Norwegian ice hockey player (Vålerenga Ishockey, Sparta Sarpsborg, national team).
- Kari Ingulstad Botterud, 81, Norwegian politician, deputy (1989–1997).
- Pina Bottin, 94, Italian actress (Marriage, A Hero of Our Times, The Intruder).
- Joyce Brabner, 72, American comic book writer (Brought to Light, Our Cancer Year).
- Rainer Brandt, 88, German actor (Street Acquaintances of St. Pauli, Horrors of Spider Island, Funeral in Berlin).
- Tommy Cassidy, 73, Northern Irish football player (Newcastle, national team) and manager (APOEL), complications from Alzheimer's disease.
- Leonard Engelman, 83, American makeup artist (Ghostbusters, Batman Forever, How the Grinch Stole Christmas).
- Dmitri Filimonov, 52, Russian ice hockey player (Ottawa Senators, Dynamo Moscow, KalPa).
- Bertrand Fourcade, 81, French rugby union player (FC Lourdes, Stade Toulousain) and coach (Italy national team).
- Ted Frechette, 84, Canadian football player (Edmonton Eskimos).
- Ken Gibbons, 92, English Anglican prelate, Archdeacon of Lancaster (1981–1997).
- Joe Hand Sr., 87, American businessman and media executive, COVID-19.
- Leonard Hayflick, 96, American anatomist (Hayflick limit), pancreatic cancer.
- Ina Jaffe, 75, American journalist (NPR), cancer.
- Villu Jürjo, 73, Estonian Lutheran cleric and political activist.
- Suzanne Kala Lobè, 71, Cameroonian journalist. (death announced on this date)
- Peter Kraus, 83, German field hockey player, Olympic champion (1972).
- Hinke Luiten, 69, Dutch artist and dress designer.
- Ochapa Onazi, 87, Nigerian professor.
- Zdeněk Prokeš, 71, Czech footballer (Bohemians 1905, 1860 Munich, Czechoslovakia national team).
- María Eugenia Ríos, 88, Mexican actress (Rubí, Chucho el roto, María Mercedes).
- Daniel Selznick, 88, American film and television producer (Blood Feud, The Making of a Legend: Gone with the Wind, Hoover vs. The Kennedys).
- Craig Shakespeare, 60, English football player (Walsall, West Bromwich Albion) and manager (Leicester City), cancer.
- Morris Solomon Jr., 80, American serial killer.
- Daniel Wansi, 42, Cameroonian footballer (Dynamo Dresden, Shenzhen Kingway, RAEC Mons).
- Patty Jo Watson, 92, American archaeologist.
- Lloyd Ziff, 81, American photographer and art director.

=== 2 ===
- Joe Brincat, 80, Maltese politician, minister of justice and governance (1979–1981) and member of the Parliamentary Assembly of the Council of Europe (1971–1992).
- Alun Carter, 59, Welsh rugby union player (Pontypool RFC, national team).
- John Clegg, 90, British actor (It Ain't Half Hot Mum, Tom & Viv, Shooting Fish).
- Sergio Codognato, 80, Italian football player (Ravenna, Cosenza) and manager (Cosenza).
- James H. Coleman, 91, American judge, associate justice of the Supreme Court of New Jersey (1994–2003).
- Abdulai Conteh, 78, Sierra Leonean lawyer and politician, chief justice of Belize (2000–2010), vice-president (1991–1992).
- Nicu Covaci, 77, Romanian rock musician (Transsylvania Phoenix).
- Paul Darling, 64, English barrister, chairman of the Levy Board (since 2020).
- Philip Fussell, 93, English cricketer.
- Galboda Gnanissara Thera, 80, Sri Lankan Buddhist monk, chief of Gangaramaya Temple (since 1959).
- Michel Godard, 90, French politician, deputy (1993–1997), mayor of Ploemeur (1983–1995).
- Barbara Howar, 89, American author and socialite, complications of dementia.
- Sheik-Umarr Mikailu Jah, 88, Sierra Leonean surgeon and politician, stroke.
- Soe Tin Latt, Burmese major general, helicopter crash.
- Henry Lim Bon Liong, 72, Filipino businessman.
- John D. Macomber, 96, American banker.
- Ivica Mavrenski, 58, Serbian basketball player (Vojvodina, Crvena zvezda) and coach (Železničar Inđija).
- Ruth Montague, 85, British Air Force officer, director of the Women's Royal Air Force (1989–1994).
- Matthew Ngosa, 46, Zambian singer-songwriter.
- Walter Orthmann, 102, Brazilian textile worker.
- Ajay Sastry, 50, Indian film director (Nenu Meeku Telusa).
- Bernard Seillier, 83, French politician, senator (1989–2008).
- Carl Sennhenn, 88, American writer and academic.
- Sharifah Azizah Syed Zain, 63, Malaysian politician, Johor State MLA (since 2018), internal bleeding.
- Chandrakant Sheth, 86, Indian poet and literary critic.
- James C. Swanson, 90, American politician, member of the Minnesota House of Representatives (1969–1984).
- Ross Terrill, 85, Australian-American sinologist.

=== 3 ===
- Tim Ambler, 87, British organizational theorist.
- Jean Battlo, 85, American playwright (Terror of the Tug).
- Morton Brown, 92, American mathematician.
- Lionel Crawford, 91–92, British cancer expert and virologist.
- Salvatore Giannone, 88, Italian Olympic sprinter (1960).
- Endre Gyulay, 93, Hungarian Roman Catholic prelate, bishop of Szeged–Csanád (1987–2006).
- Sir Ernest Hall, 94, English businessman, pianist and composer.
- Pasi Ikonen, 44, Finnish orienteering competitor, world champion (2001), brain tumour.
- Yamini Krishnamurthy, 83, Indian Bharatanatyam dancer.
- Martin Leach, 65, New Zealand-born Australian murderer and rapist, heart failure.
- Shaun Martin, 45, American musician (Snarky Puppy) and record producer, seven-time Grammy winner.
- Alan McRitchie, 81, Australian rugby league footballer (St. George, Cronulla-Sutherland).
- Antônio Meneses, 66, Brazilian cellist (Beaux Arts Trio) and academic teacher (Bern Academy of Arts), brain cancer.
- Mustapha Moussa, 62, Algerian boxer, Olympic bronze medalist (1984), injuries sustained in a traffic collision.
- Roald Muggerud, 92, Norwegian footballer (Lyn, national team)
- Jody O'Neill, 87, Northern Irish Gaelic footballer (Coalisland Na Fianna, Tyrone).
- José Agustín Ortiz Pinchetti, 87, Mexican politician, deputy (2003–2006).
- Phloen Phromdaen, 85, Thai singer.
- Ronald Roberts, 83, Scottish veterinary scientist and parasitologist.
- George Schenck, 82, American television writer and producer (NCIS).
- Teófilo Serrano, 74, Spanish politician, senator (1991–1994) and member of the Assembly of Madrid (1991–1994).
- Mark Slater, 73, Australian footballer (Collingwood).
- Kalin Stepanyan, 69, Russian football player (Oryol, Spartak Vladikavkaz) and manager (Astrakhan).
- Dimitris Theofanis, 91, Greek footballer (Panathinaikos, national team) and manager (Panegialios).
- Jim Umbarger, 71, American baseball player (Texas Rangers, Oakland Athletics), heart failure.
- Eyvind W. Wang, 81, Norwegian politician, mayor of Asker (1980–1995).
- Faye Yager, 75, American community activist.

=== 4 ===
- Nicodème Barrigah-Benissan, 61, Togolese Roman Catholic prelate, archbishop of Lomé (since 2019) and bishop of Atakpamé (2008–2019).
- Hans-Jürgen Cochius, 83, German Olympic sailor.
- Anthony Hamilton-Smith, 3rd Baron Colwyn, 82, British dentist and peer, member of the House of Lords (1967–2022), COVID-19.
- Granville Crabtree, 94, American politician, member of the Florida House of Representatives (1966–1976).
- Charles Cyphers, 85, American actor (Halloween, Assault on Precinct 13, Major League).
- James E. Dalton, 93, American general.
- Jim Doherty, 65, Scottish footballer (Kilmarnock, Clyde, Queen of the South).
- Mark Edward, 73, American mentalist and author (Psychic Blues).
- Alan Fowler, 95, American physicist.
- Alvin Goldman, 85, American philosopher ("A Causal Theory of Knowing").
- Miguel Ángel Gómez Martínez, 74, Spanish conductor and composer.
- Sir David Harcourt-Smith, 92, British air force officer, commander-in-chief Support Command (1984–1986).
- Martin Heavey, 81, Irish Gaelic footballer (Rhode, Offaly).
- Valentin Ioviță, 40, Romanian footballer (Dunărea Galați, Gloria Buzău, Sportul), stroke.
- Steve Kragthorpe, 59, American football coach (Tulsa Golden Hurricane, Louisville Cardinals), complications from Parkinson's disease.
- Tsung-Dao Lee, 97, Chinese-American physicist (Lee–Yang theory, Kinoshita–Lee–Nauenberg theorem, Lee–Yang theorem), Nobel Prize laureate (1957).
- Juan Ramón Martínez, 76, Salvadoran footballer (Municipal, Águila, national team).
- Lily Monteverde, 85, Filipino film producer (Mano Po, Shake, Rattle & Roll), founder of Regal Entertainment.
- Golam Nafiz, 16, Bangladeshi student activist, shot.
- Shobhana Ranade, 99, Indian Gandhian social worker.
- Emanoil Savin, 65, Romanian politician, senator (2016–2020) and mayor of Bușteni (since 2024), heart attack.
- Terry Snow, 80, Australian real estate developer (Canberra Airport) and philanthropist.
- Jeremy Strong, 74, British writer, bone cancer.
- Duane Thomas, 77, American football player (Dallas Cowboys, Washington Redskins), pulmonary embolism.
- Graham Thorpe, 55, English cricketer (Surrey, national team), suicide by train.
- Jude Tindall, 60, British television writer (Sister Boniface Mysteries, Shakespeare & Hathaway: Private Investigators, Father Brown).

=== 5 ===
- Adílio, 68, Brazilian footballer (Flamengo, national team), pancreatic cancer.
- John Aprea, 83, American actor (The Godfather Part II, Another World, Matt Houston).
- Ron Bain, 79, Scottish actor (Naked Video, A Kick Up the Eighties) and director (I, Lovett).
- Thomas Barrow, 85, American photographer.
- Ismail Berdiyev, 70, Russian Sunni mufti.
- Russell Blake, 89, English footballer (Colchester United).
- Twinkle Borge, 54, American activist.
- Wilson Borja, 71, Colombian trade unionist and politician, deputy (2002–2010), bone marrow cancer.
- Pascal Chabi Kao, 89, Beninese politician, minister of economy and finance (1967–1968, 1970–1972).
- Maurice Cockerill, 95, New Zealand rugby union player.
- Frances K. Conley, 83, American neurosurgeon.
- Carl Cotman, 84, American neuroscientist.
- Henry Downs, 92, British amateur bodybuilder, Mr. Universe (1960).
- Inge Henningsen, 83, Danish statistician, academic, and writer.
- George Herd, 88, Scottish football player (Sunderland, national team) and manager (Queen of the South).
- Vyacheslav Ivanov, 86, Russian rower, Olympic champion (1956, 1960, 1964).
- Li Chunting, 87, Chinese politician, governor of Shandong (1995–2001).
- Sérgio Lopes, 83, Brazilian football player (Grêmio, national team) and manager (Avaí), complications from cancer and Alzheimer's disease.
- Krishna Maharaj, 85, Trinidadian-born British businessman and convicted murderer.
- Daniel Mañó, 92, Spanish footballer (Valencia).
- Elliot McAdam, 72, Australian politician, Northern Territory MLA (2001–2008).
- Sheila McNeill, 81, American politician, member of the Georgia State Senate (2021–2023).
- Mumtaz Mustafa, Pakistani politician, MP (since 2024), heart attack.
- Evgeny Panov, 88, Russian zoologist and ethologist.
- Iurie Păsat, 51, Moldovan politician, MP (since 2021), mayor of Bălceana (2011–2015, 2019–2021), anaphylactic shock.
- Qiao Shibo, 69, Chinese businessman.
- Yuri Skobov, 75, Russian cross-country skier, Olympic champion (1972).
- Tibor Szabo, 64, English footballer (Macclesfield Town, Bradford City).
- Pierre Tiollais, 89, French physician and biologist.
- Patti Yasutake, 70, American actress (Star Trek: The Next Generation, Beef, Gung Ho), T-cell lymphoma.
- Izaskun Zubizarreta, 53, Spanish ski mountaineer.

=== 6 ===
- Vasile Bahnaru, 74, Moldovan philologist.
- Billy Bean, 60, American baseball player (Detroit Tigers, San Diego Padres, Los Angeles Dodgers), acute myeloid leukemia.
- James Bjorken, 90, American physicist (Bjorken scaling), melanoma.
- Doris Brougham, 98, American-born Taiwanese educator and missionary.
- Sarah Carter, 45, Australian politician, brain aneurysm.
- Connie Chiume, 72, South African actress (Black Panther, Rhythm City, The Air Up There) and filmmaker.
- Suzanne Débarbat, 95, French astronomer.
- Patrick Ebosele Ekpu, 92, Nigerian Roman Catholic prelate, bishop (1973–1994) and archbishop (1994–2006) of Benin City.
- Rudy Franchi, 85, American author and television personality (Antiques Roadshow), lung cancer.
- Rich Galen, 77, American political consultant and commentator.
- Javier González Mocken, 73, Mexican lawyer and politician, acting mayor of Ciudad Juárez (2015–2016), cancer.
- Monique Jacot, 89, Swiss photojournalist.
- Jay Kanter, 97, American talent agent and film producer (Fear Is the Key).
- Jim Kearney, 81, American football player (Kansas City Chiefs, Detroit Lions, New Orleans Saints).
- Sheila Kussner, 91, Canadian cancer care advocate.
- Gilles Leger, 83, Canadian ice hockey coach, scout, and executive (Quebec Nordiques, Edmonton Oilers, New York Rangers).
- Christof Nel, 80, German theatre and opera director.
- Hans Plomp, 80, Dutch poet, playwright and writer.
- Mercedes Pomares, 70, Cuban three-time Olympic volleyball player, world champion (1978).
- Dave Quested, 78, New Zealand cricket umpire.
- Bobby Thomson, 87, Scottish footballer (Aston Villa, Birmingham City).
- Myron E. Ullman, 77, American businessman, CEO of J.C. Penney (2004–2011, 2013–2016), complications from Alzheimer's disease and cancer.
- Marigene Valiquette, 99, American politician, member of the Ohio House of Representatives (1963–1969) and Senate (1969–1986).
- Robbie Venter, 64, South African tennis player.
- Kathleen Hartnett White, 74, American government official and environmental policy advisor, complications from dementia.
- Maurice Williams, 86, American doo-wop singer ("Stay").

=== 7 ===
- Jaime Alomar, 86, Spanish road racing cyclist.
- Brigitte Blobel, 81, German writer.
- Tiny Chidi, South African politician, member of the Limpopo Provincial Legislature (since 2024).
- Donald S. Coburn, 85, American politician.
- Kristian Eidesvik, 78, Norwegian maritime businessman.
- Ron Fragale, 74, American politician, member of the West Virginia House of Delegates (1990–1998, 2000–2014).
- Roxane Gilmore, 70, American academic, first lady of Virginia (1998–2002).
- Lino Jannuzzi, 96, Italian journalist and politician, senator (1968–1972, 2001–2008).
- Patrice Laffont, 84, French television presenter (Des chiffres et des lettres, Fort Boyard) and actor (The Associate), heart attack.
- Uno Lõhmus, 71, Estonian jurist, chief justice of the Supreme Court (1998–2004).
- Jon McBride, 80, American astronaut (STS-41-G) and naval officer.
- Mick McCarthy, 75, Irish hurler (Na Piarsaigh, UCC, Cork).
- Margaret Ménégoz, 83, Hungarian-born German-French film producer (Amour, The White Ribbon, Caché).
- David Miller, 78, American itinerant preacher.
- Friedrich Möbius, 96, German art and architectural historian.
- Lebogang Morula, 57, South African footballer (Jomo Cosmos, Once Caldas, national team), shot.
- Mohammad Reza Nekoonam, 75, Iranian Twelver Shi'a cleric.
- Ronald Paulson, 94, American writer and academic.
- Lisbeth L. Petersen, 85, Faroese politician, member of the Løgting (1990–2008) and Folketing (2001–2005).
- Marie-Josée Roig, 86, French politician, deputy (2007–2012), minister of family (2004), and mayor of Avignon (1995–2014).
- Jack Russell, 63, American hard rock/glam/metal/heavy metal singer and songwriter (Great White), Lewy body dementia and multiple system atrophy.
- Sai Leun, 75, Chinese-born Burmese military officer, lung cancer.
- Neil Stanley, 56, English cricketer (Bedfordshire, Northamptonshire).
- Mitsu Tanaka, 81, Japanese feminist and writer.

=== 8 ===
- Boo Ahl, 54, Swedish ice hockey player (HV71), cardiac arrest.
- Ida Bagus Ardana, 84, Indonesian bureaucrat and politician, regent of Jembrana (1980–1990).
- José Fernando Bautista, 60–61, Colombian diplomat and politician, minister of communications (1997–1998) and mayor of Cúcuta (1999–2000), heart attack.
- Buddhadeb Bhattacharjee, 80, Indian politician, chief minister (2000–2011) and deputy chief minister (1999–2000) of West Bengal, twice West Bengal MLA, complications from COPD.
- Richard Brilliant, 94, American art historian.
- Elizabeth A. R. Brown, 92, American medievalist and professor (Brooklyn College).
- Kathy Byrne, 66, American lawyer, lung cancer.
- Francesco Catanzariti, 91, Italian politician, deputy (1972–1976).
- Casey Converse, 66, American Olympic swimmer (1976), cancer.
- Chato González, 80, Spanish football player (Real Madrid, Real Murcia) and manager (Rayo Vallecano).
- Ilse Grubrich-Simitis, 88, German psychoanalyst.
- Issa Hayatou, 77, Cameroonian football executive, acting president of FIFA (2015–2016) and president of CAF (1988–2017).
- Taberon Honie, 48, American convicted murderer and rapist, execution by lethal injection.
- Ian Huntington, 92, Australian cricketer (Victoria).
- Alex Kinninmonth, 82, Scottish footballer (Dundee, Dunfermline Athletic, Forfar Athletic).
- Tomasz Lisowicz, 47, Polish racing cyclist.
- Alan Little, 69, English football player (Southend United, Barnsley) and manager (York City).
- Bengt Lönnbom, 91, Swedish major general, chief of the air staff (1984–1987).
- Harvey Marlatt, 75, American basketball player (Detroit Pistons).
- Mitzi McCall, 93, American actress (Ice Age, World's Greatest Dad, Alright Already) and comedian.
- Amrit Lal Meena, 64, Indian politician, Rajasthan MLA (since 2013), heart attack.
- Geoff Muntz, 86, Australian politician, Queensland MLA (1980–1989).
- Sumana Nellampitiya, 80, Sri Lankan journalist, radio announcer and television presenter.
- Mário Clemente Neto, 84, Brazilian Roman Catholic bishop, prelate of Tefé (1982–2000).
- Małgorzata Ostrowska, 66, Polish politician, MP (1993–2007).
- Kalatiku Paembonan, 70, Indonesian politician, regent of North Toraja (2016–2021).
- Zoran Petrović, 72, Serbian football referee.
- Bruce Pirnie, 81, Canadian Olympic shot putter (1972, 1976).
- Kemburi Ramamohan Rao, 74, Indian politician, MP (1989–1991) and Andhra Pradesh MLA (1985–1989).
- David Ray, 92, American poet and author.
- Chi-Chi Rodríguez, 88, Puerto Rican Hall of Fame golfer.
- Jorge Rodríguez, 56, Mexican footballer (Toluca, Santos Laguna, national team), Evans syndrome.
- Nelson Serrano, 85, Ecuadorian-American convicted murderer, heart attack.
- Mike Sertich, 77, American ice hockey coach (Minnesota Duluth Bulldogs).
- Steve Symms, 86, American politician and lobbyist, member of the U.S. House of Representatives (1973–1981) and Senate (1981–1993).
- Shigeo Takaya, 87, Japanese politician, mayor of Okayama (2005–2013), kidney failure.
- Woody Thompson, 71, American football player (Atlanta Falcons).
- Dženan Uščuplić, 48, Bosnian football player (Sarajevo, Olimpik) and manager (Sarajevo), struck by lightning.

=== 9 ===
- Rory Burke, 30, Irish rugby union player (Munster, Nottingham, Connacht).
- Ellen Corbett, 69, American politician, member of the California State Assembly (1998–2004) and Senate (2006–2014).
- Charles R. Cross, 67, American author (Heavier Than Heaven, Room Full of Mirrors) and music journalist (The Rocket).
- Oyewole Diya, 64, Nigerian politician, member of the house of representatives (2007–2011, 2015–2019).
- Joseph Dronzek, 84, American Olympic sprint canoer.
- Thor-Øistein Endsjø, 88, Norwegian Olympic sports shooter (1972).
- Kasper König, 80, German museum director (Museum Ludwig) and curator.
- Barbara Könneker, 89, German scholar.
- Maryvonne Le Dizès, 84, French violinist (Ensemble intercontemporain).
- Brian Marjoribanks, 82, Scottish footballer (Hibernian), actor and broadcaster (BBC Scotland).
- Barbara Moraff, 85, American Beat Generation poet. (death announced on this date)
- Jim Riswold, 66, American advertising creative director (Wieden+Kennedy), interstital lung disease.
- Thomas M. Ryan Jr., 95, American general.
- Adolf Schaller, 68, American visual artist (Astronomy).
- Fritz Siegenthaler, 95, Swiss Olympic cyclist.
- Lee Spetner, 97, American-Israeli biophysicist and creationist author.
- Kevin Sullivan, 75, American professional wrestler (CWF, GCW) and booker (WCW), complications from a blood clot.
- Keiichi Tanaami, 88, Japanese pop artist.
- Carl Weathersby, 71, American blues guitarist (Albert King, Billy Branch).
- Susan Wojcicki, 56, American business executive, CEO of YouTube (2014–2023), lung cancer.

=== 10 ===
- Joseph Andriacchi, 91, American convicted criminal (Chicago Outfit).
- Josep Manuel Basáñez, 82, Spanish businessman and politician, minister of economy and finance of Catalonia (1987–1988) and member of the Catalan parliament (1988–1989).
- Carlos Germán Belli, 96, Peruvian poet.
- Charles Biasiny-Rivera, 93, American photographer, complications from lung cancer.
- Adolf M. Birke, 84, German historian, director of the German Historical Institute London (1985–1994).
- Bobby Bottcher, 85, American dirt modified racing driver.
- Susana Cano González, 75, Mexican politician, deputy (since 2018).
- Celestina Casapietra, 85, Italian soprano (Berlin State Opera).
- Jacques Delisle, 89, Canadian jurist, judge of the Superior Court of Quebec (1985–1992) and the Quebec Court of Appeal (1992–2009).
- Bruno Frison, 88, Italian Olympic ice hockey player (1964).
- V. K. Iya, 96, Indian nuclear scientist.
- Rudolf Jelínek, 89, Czech actor (Thirty Cases of Major Zeman, The Fabulous Baron Munchausen, Zelená vlna).
- Tuíre Kayapó, 54, Brazilian indigenous rights activist and Kayapo leader, uterine cancer.
- Robert W. Lawless, 87, American academic.
- Rachael Lillis, 55, American voice actress (Pokémon, Hunter × Hunter, Winx Club), breast cancer.
- Dame June Mariu, 92, New Zealand netball player (national team) and Māori community leader, president of the Māori Women's Welfare League (1987–1990).
- Peggy Moffitt, 86, American model and actress (Girls Town, Battle Flame), complications from dementia.
- Izabela Mrzygłocka, 65, Polish politician, deputy (since 2005).
- Liam Munroe, 90, Irish footballer (Dundalk, Ards, national team).
- Tamara Murphy, 63, American chef (Terra Plata), stroke.
- Dean Roberts, 49, New Zealand musician (Thela) and composer.
- Natwar Singh, 95, Indian diplomat and politician, minister of external affairs (2004–2005) and three-times MP.
- Galina Zybina, 93, Russian shot putter and coach, Olympic champion (1952).

=== 11 ===
- Aslambek Aslakhanov, 82, Russian politician, MP (2000–2003) and senator (2008–2012).
- Haniya Aslam, 46, Pakistani musician (Zeb and Haniya), cardiac arrest.
- Ofra Bikel, 94, Israeli-American documentary filmmaker and television producer.
- Roy Blackbeard, 71, Motswana politician, MP (1989–1998).
- Samir Chamas, 81, Lebanese actor (Africano), writer and journalist.
- Mike Cubbage, 74, American baseball player (Texas Rangers, Minnesota Twins, New York Mets), cancer.
- Steve Davislim, 57, Malaysian-born Australian operatic tenor.
- Éamonn Fitzpatrick, 73, Irish hurler (St Finbarr's, University College Cork, Cork).
- Rex Howe, 95, English Anglican priest.
- Alan Kell, 75, English footballer (Darlington, Spennymoor United).
- Kutty Ahammed Kutty, 71, Indian politician, Kerala MLA (1987–1991, 1996–2006).
- Daniela Larreal, 50, Venezuelan track cyclist, five-time Olympic competitor (1996–2012), stroke.
- Barry Lategan, 89, South African-born British photographer.
- Mike Magee, 74, British journalist (The Register, The Inquirer, TechEye).
- Bitti Mohanty, Indian convicted rapist, stomach cancer.
- J. Richard Munro, 93, American media executive.
- Richard Rogler, 74, German Kabarett artist and professor (Berlin University of the Arts).
- Jim Roxburgh, 77, Australian rugby union player (New South Wales, national team).
- Ángel Salazar, 68, American comedian and actor (Scarface, Carlito's Way, Punchline).
- E. Sampathkumar, 88, Indian graph theorist, lung infection.
- Annick de Souzenelle, 101, French writer.
- Talos, 36, Irish musician.
- Noël Treanor, 73, Irish Roman Catholic prelate, apostolic nuncio to the European Union (since 2022) and bishop of Down and Connor (2008–2022).
- Donald Trescowthick, 93, Australian retailer, owner of Charles Davis (1971–2001).
- Simon Verity, 79, British sculptor and stonecarver, Lewy body dementia.

=== 12 ===
- Ramiro Blacut, 80, Bolivian football player (Bayern Munich, national team) and manager (national team).
- Marinella Bortoluzzi, 85, Italian Olympic high jumper (1960).
- Marc Bourrier, 89, French football player (Lens, Toulon) and manager (Olympique de Marseille).
- Marlene Catterall, 85, Canadian politician, MP (1988–2006).
- Maria Bianca Cita, 99, Italian geologist and paleontologist.
- Jerzy Czerwiński, 64, Polish politician, deputy (2001–2005) and senator (2015–2023).
- Cédric Daury, 54, French football player (Angers, Le Havre) and manager (Châteauroux).
- Antônio Delfim Netto, 96, Brazilian economist, minister of finance (1967–1974), agriculture (1979) and planning (1979–1985).
- Timothy Dudley-Smith, 97, British Anglican clergyman and hymnwriter, archdeacon of Norwich (1973–1981) and bishop of Thetford (1981–1992).
- Douglas Goodwin, 86, Irish cricketer (national team).
- Roy Greaves, 77, English footballer (Bolton Wanderers, Seattle Sounders, Rochdale).
- Kim Kahana, 94, American stuntman (Cool Hand Luke, Planet of the Apes) and actor (Danger Island).
- Daniel Khomskii, 85, Soviet-born German theoretical physicist (Kugel–Khomskii coupling).
- Meyer Kotkin, 68–69, American bridge player.
- Willi Lemke, 77, German football manager (Werder Bremen) and UN diplomat, cerebral haemorrhage.
- Greta M. Ljung, 82, Finnish-American statistician, cancer.
- Richard Lugner, 91, Austrian construction industry executive.
- Harold Meltzer, 58, American composer.
- Are Næss, 81, Norwegian physician and politician, MP (1993–2001).
- Valentin Piseev, 82, Russian sports administrator, president (1988–2010) and general secretary (2010–2014) of the Figure Skating Federation of Russia.
- Zdeněk Pololáník, 88, Czech composer, conductor and organist.
- Zaid Rifai, 87, Jordanian politician, prime minister (1973–1976, 1984–1989) and president of the senate (1997–2009).
- Salem Al-Ali Al-Sabah, 98, Kuwaiti royal, commander of the Kuwait National Guard (since 1967).
- Fritz Schmidt, 81, German field hockey player, Olympic champion (1972).
- Winsome Sinclair, 58, American casting director (Belly, Cadillac Records, All Eyez on Me) and film producer, colon cancer.
- Márcio Souza, 78, Brazilian writer (Galvez – Imperador do Acre).
- Peter A. Sturrock, 100, British-American physicist.
- Heidi Urbahn de Jauregui, 84, German-French Germanist.
- Charles Walker, 89, American checkers player.
- Sheila Oates Williams, 84-85, British-Australian mathematician.

=== 13 ===
- Richard Alatorre, 81, American politician, member of the California State Assembly (1973–1985) and Los Angeles City Council (1985–1999), cancer.
- Wally Amos, 88, American businessman (Famous Amos) and television personality (Learn to Read), complications from dementia.
- Michael Aron, 78, American journalist.
- Anwar Badakhshani, 91–92, Afghan-born Pakistani religious leader.
- Sid Ahmed Belkedrouci, 73, Algerian football player (MC Oran, USM Bel Abbès, national team) and manager.
- Tony Blackman, 96, British aviator.
- Ranko Bugarski, 91, Serbian linguist, academic, and author.
- Betty Cooke, 100, American jewelry designer.
- Sergio Donati, 91, Italian screenwriter (Once Upon a Time in the West, Island of the Fishmen, North Star).
- Dan Dorazio, 72, American football coach (Calgary Stampeders, BC Lions), pancreatic cancer.
- Charis Eng, 62, Singaporean-American physician and geneticist.
- Patrick Guerrand-Hermès, 91, French-Moroccan luxury industry executive.
- Charles Hughes, 91, English football coach and director (English FA).
- Mari Igata, 66, Japanese motorcycle road racer, complications from myasthenia gravis.
- Kenneth Jadlowiec, 73, American politician, member of the Pennsylvania House of Representatives (1987–2003).
- Laurie Jarman, 89, Australian footballer (Fitzroy).
- Hettie Jones, 90, American poet.
- Greg Kihn, 75, American musician (The Greg Kihn Band), songwriter ("Jeopardy"), and radio host (KFOX), complications from Alzheimer's disease.
- Lazar Lečić, 85, Macedonian-Serbian basketball coach (Rabotnički, Olimpija Ljubljana) and player (Rabotnički).
- Reinhard Meyer zu Bentrup, 85, German politician, MP (1976–1994).
- Tamale Mirundi, 60, Ugandan journalist and political analyst (NBS Television), lung disease.
- Maureen Mwanawasa, 61, Zambian lawyer, first lady (2002–2008).
- Irina Podyalovskaya, 64, Russian middle-distance runner.
- Randy Schobinger, 54, American politician, member of the North Dakota Senate (1995–2006) and House of Representatives (since 2016), cancer.
- Frank Selvy, 91, American basketball player (Furman Paladins, Milwaukee/St. Louis Hawks, Minneapolis/Los Angeles Lakers).
- Paul Stehrenberger, 85, Swiss football player (Luzern, national team) and manager (FC Aarau).
- Chuck Strahl, 67, Canadian politician, minister of transport (2010–2011) and agriculture (2006–2007), MP (1993–2011), mesothelioma.
- Mieczysław Strzałka, 77, Polish Olympic gymnast (1972).
- Herschell Turner, 86, American basketball player (Chicago Majors, Pittsburgh Pipers, Anaheim Amigos).
- Fritz Von Goering, 94, American professional wrestler.
- Cletus Wotorson, 87, Liberian politician, member (since 2006) and president pro tempore (2009–2012) of the Senate.

=== 14 ===
- Jan-Erik Åkerström, 88, Swedish Olympic bobsledder (1964).
- Lasse Björn, 92, Swedish ice hockey player, Olympic bronze medallist (1952).
- Howard Charles Clark, 94, New Zealand-born Canadian chemist and university administrator, president of Dalhousie University (1986–1995).
- Georges Corm, 84, Lebanese economist and politician, minister of finance (1998–2000).
- Godawari Dutta, 93, Indian painter.
- Ken Eberts, 81, American artist.
- Denise Gagnon, 87, Canadian actress (In the Shadow of the Wind, The Novena, Red Eyes).
- Bob Gallagher, 76, American baseball player (Boston Red Sox, Houston Astros, New York Mets).
- Jeremy Gilbert-Rolfe, 79, British-born American painter and art critic.
- Sture Grahn, 92, Swedish Olympic cross-country skier (1956).
- Hermann Haken, 97, German physicist.
- Eugènie Herlaar, 84, Dutch news presenter (NOS Journaal).
- Eugenia Kalnay, 81, Argentine meteorologist.
- Eva Kreisky, 79, Austrian political scientist and jurist.
- Takayuki Kubota, 89, Japanese-American karateka, founder of Gosoku-ryu.
- John Lansing, 67, American journalist and broadcaster (Scripps Networks, USAGM, NPR).
- Gary E. Luck, 87, American military officer.
- Dennis MacKay, 82, Canadian politician, British Columbia MLA (2001–2009).
- Delbar Nazari, 68, Afghan politician, minister of women's affairs (2015–2021), cardiac arrest.
- Tommy Roberts, 96, American sportscaster and businessman.
- Gena Rowlands, 94, American actress (A Woman Under the Influence, Gloria, The Notebook), four-time Emmy winner, complications from Alzheimer's disease.
- Mark Santer, 87, English Anglican clergyman, bishop of Kensington (1981–1987) and Birmingham (1987–2002).
- Milan Špinka, 73, Czech speedway rider (Rudá Hvězda Praha, Ipswich Witches, Swindon Robins), ice speedway world champion (1974).
- Heinrich Thun, 85, Austrian Olympic athlete (1960, 1964), heart attack.
- Alexander Ushakov, 76, Russian biathlete, world champion (1970, 1974, 1977).
- Raymond Windsor, 81, English cricketer.
- Henryk Wróbel, 89, Polish footballer (Lech Poznań, Zawisza Bydgoszcz).
- Jan Yager, 72, American artist, breast cancer.

=== 15 ===
- Ram Narain Agarwal, 84, Indian aerospace engineer.
- Russell Atkins, 98, American poet, playwright, and composer.
- Sergey Bagayev, 82, Russian physicist, director of the Institute of Laser Physics (1992–2016).
- BeatKing, 39, American rapper ("Then Leave"), pulmonary embolism.
- Jaime Botín, 88, Spanish banker, art collector, and convicted smuggler.
- Galina Brok-Beltsova, 99, Russian bomber navigator (587th Bomber Aviation Regiment).
- Bones, 21, American bucking bull, Professional Bull Riders World Champion Bull (2008, 2010).
- Joe Chambers, 81, American singer.
- William T. Doyle, 98, American politician, member of the Vermont Senate (1969–2017).
- Tarık Ziya Ekinci, 99, Turkish politician, MP (1965–1969).
- George Goehring, 91, American composer ("Half Heaven – Half Heartache").
- Olga Horak, 98, Czechoslovak-born Australian Holocaust survivor. (death announced on this date)
- Ivair, 79, Brazilian footballer (Portuguesa, Fluminense, national team), cancer.
- Rowena Jackson, 98, New Zealand prima ballerina.
- Sergey Kalyakin, 72, Belarusian politician.
- Imre Komora, 84, Hungarian football player (Budapest Honvéd, national team) and manager (Olympiacos), Olympic champion (1964).
- Peter Marshall, 98, American game show host (Hollywood Squares) and actor (Annie, Ensign Pulver), four-time Emmy winner, kidney failure.
- Karen Mayne, 78, American politician, member of the Utah State Senate (2008–2023).
- Jim McLaughlin, 83, Northern Irish football player (Shrewsbury Town, national team) and manager (Derry City).
- Louis Mermaz, 92, French politician, president of the National Assembly (1981–1986), minister of agriculture (1990–1992) and twice of transport.
- Kevin Parsons, 62–63, Canadian politician, Newfoundland and Labrador MHA (2008–2021) and mayor of Flatrock (2005–2008).
- Ľubomír Paulovič, 71, Slovak actor (She Grazed Horses on Concrete, It's Better to Be Wealthy and Healthy Than Poor and Ill, The Peacemaker), heart failure.
- Peter Procter, 94, British cyclist and racing driver, lung cancer.
- Joachim Seelig, 82, German physical chemist.
- Bob Weatherwax, 83, American dog trainer.
- John Woods, 87, Canadian logician and philosopher.

=== 16 ===
- Virginia Ogilvy, Countess of Airlie, 91, American-born British aristocrat, lady of the bedchamber (1973–2022).
- Aydemir Akbaş, 88, Turkish actor (Kolpaçino, Avrupalı).
- Afa Anoaʻi, 81, Samoan-American Hall of Fame professional wrestler (WWF, Stampede, GCW).
- Sasagu Arai, 94, Japanese religious historian.
- Jean-Pierre Bansard, 84, French businessman and politician, senator (2017–2018, since 2021).
- Charles Blackwell, 84, English arranger ("Johnny Remember Me"), film composer (Some Girls Do) and songwriter ("Come Outside").
- Scott Bloomquist, 60, American late model racing driver, plane crash.
- Tom Brown Jr., 74, American survivalist.
- David Stuart Davies, 78, English writer (The Scroll of the Dead, The Devil's Promise, The Ripper Legacy).
- Betty Jean Hall, 78, American lawyer.
- Bobby Hicks, 91, American Hall of Fame bluegrass fiddler, complications from a heart attack.
- Luther Kent, 76, American blues singer and radio host (WBRH).
- Mahmoud Sir Al-Khatam, 58, Sudanese politician, minister of education (since 2022), heart attack.
- Claude King, 85, American football player (Houston Oilers, Boston Patriots).
- Alison Laurie, 83, New Zealand academic.
- John Lee, 71, American football player (San Diego Chargers, New England Patriots).
- Rajko Maksimović, 89, Serbian composer, writer, and music pedagogue.
- S. C. Marak, 83, Indian politician, chief minister of Meghalaya (1993–1998).
- James McIntire, 71, American politician, Washington state treasurer (2009–2017), member of the Washington House of Representatives (1998–2009).
- Viraj Mendis, Sri Lankan expatriate, British deportee, and German refugee.
- Helmut Metzler, 79, Austrian footballer (national team).
- Álvaro Monjardino, 93, Portuguese politician, president of the Legislative Assembly of the Azores (1976–1984).
- Domingo Pérez, 88, Uruguayan footballer (Rampla Juniors, Nacional, national team).
- Graham Rawle, 69, British writer and collage artist, cancer.
- Robin Sampson, 83, New Zealand Olympic archer (1972).
- Robert Sidaway, 82, English film producer (Battle of the Brave), writer (Rainbow, Best of British), and actor.
- Norman Spencer, 110, British film producer (Summertime, Vanishing Point) and screenwriter (Hobson's Choice).
- Michael Sperberg-McQueen, 70, American philologist and markup language specialist (XML).
- Autry Stephens, 86, American oil industry executive, founder of Endeavor Energy Resources, prostate cancer.
- Merle Thornton, 93, Australian women's rights activist.
- Scott Thorson, 65, American gigolo and writer (Behind the Candelabra: My Life with Liberace), cancer and heart disease.
- Judy Williams, 80, British table tennis player.
- Kevin Wilson, 96, Australian Olympic sailor.

=== 17 ===
- Black Caviar, 17, Australian Hall of Fame Thoroughbred racehorse, world's best racehorse (2013), euthanised.
- Blanca Flor Bonilla, 72, Salvadoran politician, deputy (2000–2009) and mayor of Ayutuxtepeque (2009–2012).
- Justyna Burska, 29, Polish swimmer, traffic collision.
- Federico Caballero, 88, Filipino epic chanter, National Living Treasures Awardee.
- Miquel Caminal i Cerdà, 71, Spanish politician, senator (2019–2023).
- Pierre Cartier, 92, French mathematician (Cartier divisors, Cartier duality, Cartier isomorphism).
- Hans Eijkenbroek, 84, Dutch football player (Sparta Rotterdam, national team) and manager (AZ Alkmaar).
- Giulio Fiou, 86, Italian politician, mayor of Aosta (1992–1995).
- Helen Fisher, 79, American anthropologist and researcher, endometrial cancer.
- Mahesh Chandra Guru, 67, Indian mass communication scholar.
- Hammoudi Al-Harithi, 88, Iraqi actor (Tahit Moos Al-Hallaq).
- Max Hengel, 47, Luxembourgish politician, deputy (since 2022), colon cancer.
- Truus Hennipman, 81, Dutch Olympic sprinter (1968).
- Landon Jones, 80, American editor (People) and author, complications from myelofibrosis.
- Sirak Melkonian, 93, Iranian-Armenian painter.
- Roy Minton, 90, English playwright (Scum).
- Evgeny Mishin, 48, Russian bodybuilder and actor (Power, The Punisher, The Blacklist).
- Park Ji-weon, 90, South Korean politician, MP (1988–1992).
- Eugene Quilban, 58, Filipino basketball player (Pepsi Mega Bottlers, Alaska Milkmen, Davao Eagles), pancreatic cancer.
- Johnny "Dandy" Rodríguez, 78, American bongo player (Tito Puente, Tito Rodríguez, Ray Barretto).
- Silvio Santos, 93, Brazilian television presenter (Programa Silvio Santos) and broadcasting network executive, founder of Grupo Silvio Santos and SBT, bronchopneumonia.
- Zhou Guangzhao, 95, Chinese theoretical physicist and politician, president of CAS (1987–1997) and vice chairperson of the NPCSC (1998–2003).

=== 18 ===
- Ronny Borchers, 67, German football player (Eintracht Frankfurt) and manager (Kickers Offenbach, FSV Frankfurt).
- Jim Brady, 88, American baseball player (Detroit Tigers) and academic, president of Jacksonville University (1989–1996).
- Bob Brinker, 78, American radio host.
- Harry Bruce, 90, Canadian writer and journalist.
- Boris Bystrov, 79, Russian actor (Aladdin and His Magic Lamp, Adventures of the Yellow Suitcase, TASS Is Authorized to Declare...).
- John Claro, 93, Indian writer, tiatr director and actor.
- Ruth Johnson Colvin, 107, American philanthropist, founder of ProLiteracy.
- Elly Cordiviola, 84, Argentine ichthyologist.
- Alain Delon, 88, French-Swiss actor (Rocco and His Brothers, The Leopard, Le Samouraï) and film producer, B-cell lymphoma.
- Phil Donahue, 88, American talk show host (The Phil Donahue Show) and filmmaker (Body of War).
- Kenneth C. Flint, 77, American author.
- Vladislav Gostishchev, 83, Russian actor (At the Beginning of Glorious Days, A Cruel Romance).
- Ulrike Hoffmann-Richter, 66, German psychiatrist.
- Julyan Holmes, 75, British scholar and poet.
- Michael Ernest Kassner, 73, American materials science engineer.
- Kevin Kehily, 74, Irish Gaelic footballer (Cork).
- George Latimer, 89, American politician, mayor of Saint Paul, Minnesota (1976–1990).
- Toussaint Natama, 41, Burkinabé footballer (Al Ittihad Alexandria Club, K.V.C. Westerlo).
- Victor Okuley Nortey, 65–66, Ghanaian politician, MP (1999–2009).
- Rakesh Pal, 58, Indian flag officer, director general of the Coast Guard (since 2023), heart attack.
- Christian Pommerenke, 90, German mathematician.
- Ken Rollin, 86, English rugby league player (Wakefield Trinity, Leeds Rhinos).
- Baruj Salinas, 89, Cuban-American contemporary visual artist and architect.
- Dušan Šinigoj, 90, Slovene economist and politician, president of the Executive Council of the Socialist Republic of Slovenia (1984–1990).
- Franciszek Smuda, 76, Polish football player (Legia Warsaw) and manager (Widzew Łódź, national team).
- Konstantin Zagorsky, 91, Russian production designer (Aladdin and His Magic Lamp, The Scarlet Flower, Mio in the Land of Faraway).

=== 19 ===
- Berhane Abrehe, 79, Eritrean politician, minister of finance (2001–2012).
- James Reed Averill, 88, American psychologist.
- Maria Branyas, 117, American-born Spanish supercentenarian, world's oldest person (since 2023).
- Klaus Dockhorn, 71, German Olympic swimmer (1972).
- Lalo Gomes, 68, Brazilian-born Paraguayan politician, deputy (since 2023), shot.
- Michel Guérard, 91, French chef, inventor of cuisine minceur.
- David Hadley, 75, American football player (Kansas City Chiefs).
- Mike Lynch, 59, British businessman, co-founder of Autonomy Corporation and Darktrace, suffocation.
- Kiddu Makubuya, 75, Ugandan politician, attorney general (2005–2011).
- Mosco de la Merced, 60, Mexican professional wrestler (AAA).
- R. Peter Munves, 97, American record executive.
- Guy de Muyser, 98, Luxembourgish jurist, economist, and diplomat, chief of staff to Jean, Grand Duke of Luxembourg (1969–1981).
- Sundararajan Padmanabhan, 83, Indian general officer, chief of the Army Staff (2000–2002).
- Luca Persiani, 40, Italian race car driver (European Le Mans Series), traffic collision.
- Richard Pettibone, 86, American artist, complications from a fall.
- Néstor Salvador Quintana, 90, Argentine journalist and politician, mayor of Salta (1982–1983) and member of the Chamber of Deputies of Salta (1985–1989).
- Somaya Ramadan, 73, Egyptian writer and translator.
- Võ Tòng Xuân, 83, Vietnamese agricultural expert.
- Wang Qimin, 86, Chinese petroleum engineer.
- Dink Widenhouse, 92, American racecar driver.

=== 20 ===
- Al Attles, 87, American basketball player, executive and coach (Golden State Warriors), NBA champion (1975).
- Emmanuel Ayoola, 90, Nigerian lawyer and judge, chairman of the Independent Corrupt Practices Commission (2005–2010).
- Werner Bokelberg, 86, German photographer (Stern) and film actor.
- Antonio Carmine Centi, 80, Italian politician, member of the Regional Council of Abruzzo (1990–1994), mayor of L'Aquila (1994–1998).
- Utpalendu Chakrabarty, 76, Indian filmmaker (Chokh, Debshishu).
- Benoîte Crevoisier, 86, Swiss writer and schoolteacher.
- Graciela De Pierris, 74, American philosopher.
- Yvonne Delcour, 92, Belgian actress (Moscow, Belgium).
- Bob Fitzharris, 78, British Anglican priest, archdeacon of Doncaster (2001–2011).
- Alice Green, 84, American activist and prison reform advocate.
- Hushang Harirchiyan, 92, Iranian actor (The Wind Carpet, A Little Kiss, The Chef) and comedian.
- Charles A. Heimbold Jr., 91, American diplomat and pharmaceuticals CEO of Bristol Myers Squibb (1994–2001).
- Sam Landsberger, 35, Australian journalist (Herald Sun, Fox Footy), traffic collision.
- Józef Maroszek, 73, Polish historian.
- Humberto Maschio, 91, Argentine-Italian football player (Racing Club, Atalanta, Argentina national team) and manager, kidney failure.
- Manju Mehta, 79, Indian sitar player.
- Zenbee Mizoguchi, 78, Japanese politician, governor of Shimane Prefecture (2007–2019).
- Ramiro Moliner Inglés, 83, Spanish Roman Catholic prelate, apostolic nuncio to Guatemala (1997–2004), Papua New Guinea (1993–1997), and Albania (2008–2016).
- Charin Nantanakorn, 91, Thai singer.
- Marc Pilisuk, 90, American scholar.
- Pilot Baba, 86, Indian air force officer and spiritual leader.
- Brooke Rangi, 41, New Zealand athlete, brain cancer.
- Mary Sey, 72, Gambian jurist, judge of the Supreme Court of Vanuatu (2014–2017) and justice of the Supreme Court of the Gambia (since 2017).
- James Soletski, 75, American politician, member of the Wisconsin State Assembly (2007–2011).
- Atsuko Tanaka, 61, Japanese voice actress (Ghost in the Shell, Naruto, JoJo's Bizarre Adventure).
- Raly Tejada, 53, Filipino diplomat and lawyer, abdominal aortic aneurysm.
- Roger Theisen, 92, Luxembourgian Olympic fencer (1956, 1960).
- Ratomir Tvrdić, 80, Croatian basketball player (Jugoplastika Split, Yugoslavia national team, 1972 Olympics).

=== 21 ===
- Thelma Davidson Adair, 103, American educator and Presbyterian church leader, moderator of the General Assembly of the UPCUSA (1976).
- John Amos, 84, American actor (Good Times, Roots, The West Wing), heart failure.
- David Anfam, 69, English art historian.
- Don Aslett, 89, American businessman and author.
- Rolf Bækkelund, 99, Norwegian violinist and conductor.
- Henryk Blaszka, 66, Polish Olympic sailor (1988).
- Didier Borotra, 86, French politician, senator (1992–2011), mayor of Biarritz (1991–2014).
- Howard Dee, 93, Filipino businessman, president of Unilab (1965–1972), ambassador to the Holy See (1986–1990), stroke.
- Diana, 76, Brazilian singer.
- James Duderstadt, 81, American nuclear engineer and university administrator, president of the University of Michigan (1988–1996).
- Gösta Eriksson, 93, Swedish rower, Olympic silver medallist (1956).
- Paquito García, 86, Spanish football player (Valencia, national team) and manager (Villarreal).
- Tim Hinkley, 78, English musician and record producer.
- Imbert Jebbink, 77, Dutch Olympic field hockey player (1976).
- Euan MacDonald, 50, Scottish disability rights activist (Euan's Guide, Euan MacDonald Centre), complications from motor neurone disease.
- Nell McCafferty, 80, Irish journalist (The Irish Press, The Irish Times, Sunday Tribune), playwright and activist, complications from a stroke.
- Eddie McKay, 86, Northern Irish Gaelic football player (Down) and manager (RGU Downpatrick, Longstone).
- Bradley McStravick, 68, British Olympic decathlete (1980, 1984), traffic collision.
- Nick Mileti, 93, American sports team owner (Cleveland Indians, Cleveland Cavaliers, Cleveland Barons).
- Ken Miller, 82, American football coach (Saskatchewan Roughriders), cancer.
- Sonja Pachta, 83, Austrian tennis player.
- Bill Pascrell, 87, American politician, member of the U.S. House of Representatives (since 1997) and New Jersey General Assembly (1988–1997), mayor of Paterson, New Jersey (1990–1997).
- Manuel Pérez Castell, 76, Spanish academic and politician, mayor of Albacete (1999–2007) and deputy (2008–2011).
- Oleksiy Prylipka, 80, Ukrainian agronomist and political scientist. (death announced on this date)
- Harold Raley, 89, American Hispanist and philosopher.
- Dave Rearick, 92, American rock climber and mathematician.
- Gary Rulon, 83, American jurist, judge (1988–2011) and chief judge (2001–2011) of the Kansas Court of Appeals.
- William Smith, 85, South African science and mathematics teacher, cancer.
- Rodney Smithson, 80, English football player (Oxford United, Arsenal) and manager (Witney Town).
- Robert Stern, 62, British philosopher, brain cancer.
- Vesla Vetlesen, 93, Norwegian weaver and politician, minister of international development (1986–1988).
- Hans Weiner, 73, German footballer (Hertha BSC, Bayern Munich, Chicago Sting).
- Per Werenskiold, 80, Norwegian Olympic sailor (1968, 1972).
- Delwyn Williams, 85, British politician and solicitor, MP (1979–1983).
- Primo Zamparini, 85, Italian bantamweight boxer, Olympic silver medalist (1960), complications from a fall.

=== 22 ===
- Gordon Sutherland Anderson, 89–90, American politician, member of the Oregon House of Representatives (2003–2007).
- Camilla Mary Carr, 66, British aid worker.
- Giles Cheatle, 71, English cricketer (Surrey, Sussex).
- Jim Crowley, 94, Irish Gaelic footballer (St Vincents, Dublin GAA).
- Pete Daley, 94, American baseball player (Boston Red Sox, Kansas City Athletics, Washington Senators).
- Ottaviano Del Turco, 79, Italian politician, minister of finance (2000–2001), MEP (2004–2005), and president of Abruzzo (2005–2008).
- Felice Maurizio D'Ettore, 64, Italian politician, deputy (2018–2022).
- Ron Gautsche, 89, American racing driver.
- Arthur J. Gregg, 96, American army general, namesake of Fort Gregg-Adams.
- Mark Gwyn, 61, American law enforcement officer, director of the Tennessee Bureau of Investigation (2004–2018).
- Theresa Kane, 87, American religious sister.
- Claire Lomas, 44, British charity campaigner and event rider, injuries sustained in plane crash.
- Peter Lundgren, 59, Swedish tennis player and coach.
- Michael E. Malinowski, 75, American diplomat, ambassador to Nepal (2001–2004).
- Dewi "Pws" Morris, 76, Welsh actor (Grand Slam), singer and television presenter.
- Ghulam Murshid, 84, Bangladeshi writer and journalist.
- Victor Niculescu, 75, Romanian footballer (Universitatea Craiova, Jiul Petroșani, Corvinul Hunedoara).
- Gerald O'Collins, 93, Australian Jesuit priest and theologian (Jesus: A Portrait, Christology: A Biblical, Historical, and Systematic Study of Jesus).
- Marcel Parent, 92, Canadian politician, member of the National Assembly of Quebec (1984–1988).
- Faruq al-Qaddumi, 93, Palestinian politician.
- Marvin Robinson, 67, American politician, member of the Kansas House of Representatives (since 2023).
- Granville Smith, 87, Welsh footballer (Newport County, Bristol Rovers).
- Sphen, 11, Australian gentoo penguin, euthanised. (death announced on this date)
- Edward M. Stricker, 83, American neuroscientist.
- Grenville Turner, 87, British geochemist.
- George M. Wilson, 81, American philosopher.

=== 23 ===
- Elio Battaglia, 90, Italian baritone, teacher, and author.
- Bette Bourne, 84, British actor, drag queen and activist.
- John Isaiah Brauman, 86, American chemist.
- Nathan Dahlberg, 59, New Zealand racing cyclist.
- Abraham H. de Vries, 87, South African Afrikaans short story writer.
- Robert Dow, 79, American Olympic fencer.
- Trude Dybendahl, 58, Norwegian cross-country skier, Olympic silver medallist (1988, 1992, 1994).
- Nari Hira, 85–86, Indian publisher (Stardust, Society) and film producer (Bhram).
- Ralph Lewis Knowles, 95, American academic.
- Russell Malone, 60, American jazz guitarist, heart attack.
- Predrag Matić, 62, Croatian politician, MP (2015–2019) and MEP (since 2019).
- Thomas Gale Moore, 93, American economist.
- Christian Obi, 57, Nigerian football player (Julius Berger F.C., 1988 Olympics) and manager (Heartland), traffic collision.
- Wojciech Paszkowski, 64, Polish actor.
- Noel Pullen, 79, Australian politician, Victoria MLA (2002–2004).
- Catherine Ribeiro, 82, French singer (Catherine Ribeiro + Alpes) and actress (The Carabineers, Buffalo Bill, Hero of the Far West).
- Rich Sowells, 75, American football player (New York Jets, Houston Oilers).
- Mike Stensrud, 68, American football player (Iowa State University, Houston Oilers, Kansas City Chiefs).
- Shlomo Sternberg, 87, American mathematician and academic.
- Chalongphob Sussangkarn, 74, Thai economist, minister of finance (2007–2008).
- Victoria Thompson, 76, American author.
- Cunnie Williams, 61, American R&B singer. (death announced on this date)

=== 24 ===
- Michael Bawtree, 86, Canadian playwright (The Last of the Tsars) and theatre director.
- Kathie Conway, 69, American politician, member of the Missouri House of Representatives (2011–2019), brain cancer.
- Christoph Daum, 70, German football player (1. FC Köln II) and manager (Bayer 04 Leverkusen, Romania national team), lung cancer.
- Luis Escobar Cerda, 97, Chilean economist and politician, minister of finance (1984–1985) and of economy, development and reconstruction (1961–1963).
- Betty Halbreich, 96, American personal shopper (Bergdorf Goodman), cancer.
- Karel Heřmánek, 76, Czech actor (Fešák Hubert, Give the Devil His Due, Forbidden Dreams), suicide by gunshot.
- Hu Ping-chuan, 87, Chinese table tennis player.
- Siegfried Lorenz, 78, German operatic baritone.
- Cesar Mangawang, 71, Filipino journalist, heart failure.
- Mickey, 76, Brazilian footballer (São Paulo, Fluminense).
- Eric Moten, 56, American football player (San Diego Chargers).
- Ishaque Ali Khan Panna, 58, Bangladeshi politician and businessman.
- Bobby Rascoe, 84, American basketball player (Western Kentucky Hilltoppers, Phillips 66ers, Kentucky Colonels).
- George Rhoden, 97, Jamaican sprinter, two-time Olympic champion (1952).
- Víctor Roqueme Quiñonez, 26, Colombian politician and presidential advisor, mayor of Aguachica (since 2024), leukemia.
- Hans-Ulrich Schmincke, 86, German volcanologist.
- Rukman Senanayake, 76, Sri Lankan politician, MP (1973–1977, 1994–2010).
- Stephen E. Thorpe, 54, English-born New Zealand entomologist, stabbed.
- Christine Weidinger, 78, American operatic soprano.
- Alex Xydias, 102, American hot rod car racer.
- Christos Yannaras, 89, Greek philosopher and Eastern Orthodox theologian.

=== 25 ===
- John Bilbija, 65, Australian rugby league player (Balmain Tigers, Western Suburbs Magpies, South Sydney Rabbitohs).
- Joe D'Alessandris, 70, American football coach (San Diego Chargers, Buffalo Bills, Baltimore Ravens).
- Glenda Ecleo, 87, Filipino politician, member of the house of representatives (1987–1995, 2001–2010), governor of the Dinagat Islands (2010–2019).
- Amadeo Francis, 92, Puerto Rican Olympic hurdler (1952, 1956).
- Roger Groom, 87, Australian politician, member of the Tasmanian House of Assembly (1976–1997).
- Gu Angran, 94, Chinese politician.
- Salim Al-Huss, 94, Lebanese politician, acting president (1988–1989) and three-time prime minister.
- Claus Jönsson, 94, German physicist.
- Oh Seung-myung, 78, South Korean actor (Pillar of Mist, Passion Portrait, Seoul Evita).
- Maciej Orlik, 86, Polish Olympic sport shooter (1976).
- David Raju Palaparthi, 66, Indian politician, Andhra Pradesh MLA (1999–2004, 2014–2019), kidney disease.
- Rob Pitts, 45, American car salesman and reality television personality, cancer.
- Brian Seeley, 90, Northern Irish Gaelic footballer (Clan na Gael Gaelic Athletic Club, Armagh).
- Michel Siffre, 85, French explorer (Punta Marguareis).
- Rod Vaughan, 77, New Zealand journalist and television journalist.
- Wang Ying, 66, Chinese actor (Battle of Xiangjiang River).
- Don Wert, 86, American baseball player (Detroit Tigers, Washington Senators), 1968 World Series champion.
- Sugathapala Senarath Yapa, 88, Sri Lankan director (Hanthane Kathawa).

=== 26 ===
- Gholam Reza Afkhami, 87, Iranian-American scholar and author.
- Nabil Elaraby, 89, Egyptian politician, minister of foreign affairs (2011), secretary general of the Arab League (2011–2016) and judge at the International Court of Justice (2001–2006).
- Mahal Baloch, 22–23, Pakistani militant, suicide bomb.
- Danelle Barrett, 57, American rear admiral, brain cancer.
- Fabio Biancalani, 62, Argentine businessman and politician, senator (2007–2013), heart attack and stroke.
- Dominique Bulamatari, 69, Congolese Roman Catholic prelate, auxiliary bishop of Kinshasa (1999–2009) and bishop of Molegbe (2009–2023).
- Vasantrao Balwantrao Chavan, 70, Indian politician, MP (since 2024), Maharashtra MLA (2009–2019).
- Paul Dwayne, 60, Canadian singer-songwriter.
- Sven-Göran Eriksson, 76, Swedish football player and manager (IFK Göteborg, Benfica, England national team), pancreatic cancer.
- Sid Eudy, 63, American professional wrestler (WWF, WCW), non-Hodgkin lymphoma.
- Reza Ghotbi, 86, Iranian engineer.
- Bernard Glieberman, 84, American businessman and sports team owner, acute myeloid leukemia and stroke.
- Alexander Goehr, 92, German-born English composer (Behold the Sun, Arianna) and professor of music at the University of Cambridge (1976–1999).
- Lutz Hachmeister, 64, German media historian, filmmaker, and journalist, founder of the Institute for Media and Communication Policy.
- Medo Halimy, 19, Palestinian social media personality, airstrike.
- Rana Afzaal Hussain, 77, Pakistani politician, MNA (2008–2018), heart attack.
- Kō Bun'yū, 85, Taiwanese author. (death announced on this date)
- Santiago Machuca, 95, Puerto Rican Olympic sports shooter (1972).
- Richard Macphail, 73, English musician (Anon), road manager (Genesis) and businessman.
- Nojim Maiyegun, 83, Nigerian boxer, Olympic bronze medallist (1964).
- Oleksii Mes, 30, Ukrainian fighter pilot, plane crash.
- K. C. Potter, 85, American academic administrator (Vanderbilt University).
- Benji Radach, 45, American mixed martial artist.
- Bijili Ramesh, 46, Indian actor (Natpe Thunai, Nenjamundu Nermaiyundu Odu Raja, Zombie), comedian, and YouTuber, liver failure.
- Eugene Rousseau, 92, American saxophonist.
- Oleg Rydny, 57, Russian footballer and manager (Shakhtar Donetsk, Dynamo, FC Lokomotiv-KMV Mineralnye Vody).
- Alan Stone, 93, American political scientist and writer.
- Marcel Tessier, 90, Canadian historian and opera singer.
- Kristin Bervig Valentine, 91, American academic.
- Frank Warren, 89, American racing driver.
- Susan Cotts Watkins, 85, American demographer and professor.
- Howard Ziehm, 84, American pornographic film director and producer (Flesh Gordon).

=== 27 ===
- Attilio Bitondo, 96, American labor leader and gangster (Genovese crime family).
- Bob Carr, 81, American politician, member of the U.S. House of Representatives (1975–1981, 1983–1995).
- Howard Crook, 77, American lyric tenor.
- Les Earnest, 93, American computer scientist.
- Thomas Geve, 94, German-born Israeli engineer, author and Holocaust survivor.
- Ron Hale, 78, American actor (Ryan's Hope, General Hospital, All the President's Men).
- Jim Houghton, 75, American actor (Knots Landing, The Young and the Restless) and television writer (The Bold and the Beautiful), mesothelioma.
- René Hourquet, 82, French rugby union referee and administrator, treasurer of the French Rugby Federation (2000–2012).
- Kazuko Ito-Yamaizumi, 89, Japanese table tennis player.
- Juan Izquierdo, 27, Uruguayan footballer (Nacional, Cerro, Montevideo Wanderers), cardiac arrhythmia.
- Mark Jury, 80, American photographer and filmmaker, heart failure.
- Charlotte Kretschmann, 114, German supercentenarian, oldest living person in Germany (since 2023).
- Holly Lisle, 63, American author (Fire in the Mist).
- Mohan, 76, Indian film director (Pakshe, Isabella, Oru Katha Oru Nunakkatha).
- Moniruzzaman, 84, Bangladeshi linguist.
- Makaya Ntshoko, 84, South African jazz drummer.
- Charles Pittman, 76, American politician, member of the Mississippi State Senate (1980–1984).
- Renato Ricci, 84, Australian footballer (Richmond).
- Leonard Riggio, 83, American art collector and businessman, chairman of Barnes & Noble (1971–2019), complications from Alzheimer's disease.
- Rena Rolska, 92, Polish singer, dancer and actress.
- Serhiy Serhiychuk, 53, Ukrainian politician, governor of Cherkasy Oblast (2020), missile strike.
- Pete Wade, 89, American guitarist, complications from hip surgery.
- Colt Wynn, 39, American bodybuilder.

=== 28 ===
- Adolf Antrich, 83, Austrian footballer (SK Rapid Wien, Kapfenberger SV, national team).
- Maizie Barker-Welch, 96, Barbadian women's rights activist and politician, MP (1986–1991).
- Donald A. Bryant, 74, American bioscientist.
- Chiyotenzan Daihachirō, 48, Japanese sumo wrestler.
- Jack Conaty, 77, American broadcast journalist and political reporter (WFLD-TV).
- Tom Donchez, 72, American football player (Chicago Bears).
- Andreas Dückstein, 97, Austrian chess grandmaster.
- K. C. Fox, 70, American set decorator (The Girl with the Dragon Tattoo, Speed, Criminal Minds), pancreatic cancer.
- Stephen Freese, 64, American politician, member of the Wisconsin State Assembly (1991–2007), cancer.
- Iryna Glibko, 34, Ukrainian handball player (CSM București, SCM Râmnicu Vâlcea, national team).
- Andrew C. Greenberg, 67, American video game developer (Wizardry).
- Abdulrahman Mohammed Jamsheer, 80, Bahraini politician, member of the Consultative Council (since 2002).
- Denzil Keelor, 90, Indian air force officer, Vir Chakra recipient (1965).
- Léon Klares, 88, Luxembourgish Olympic sprint canoer (1960).
- Michael Lerner, 81, American political activist and magazine editor (Tikkun).
- Mary Ann Mansigh, 91, American computer programmer.
- Renato Moura, 75, Portuguese politician and tax administrator, member of the Legislative Assembly of the Azores.
- Obi Ndefo, 51, American actor (Dawson's Creek, Stargate SG-1).
- Michael Pak Jeong-il, 97, South Korean Roman Catholic prelate, bishop of Jeju (1977–1982), Jeonju (1982–1988) and Masan (1988–2002).
- Salath Rasasack, 90, Laotian politician and political prisoner, cholangiocarcinoma.
- Karl N. Snow, 94, American politician, member of the Utah State Senate (1973–1984).
- Renzo de' Vidovich, 90, Italian journalist and politician, deputy (1972–1976).
- Behzod Yoʻldoshev, 79, Uzbek physicist, president of the Academy of Sciences of Uzbekistan (2000–2005, since 2017).

=== 29 ===
- Kevin Abley, 89, Australian footballer (Glenelg).
- Abu Shujaa, 26, Palestinian militant, leader of the Tulkarm Brigade (since 2022), shot.
- Kurt Bendlin, 81, German decathlete, Olympic bronze medallist (1968).
- Adolfo Calisto, 80, Portuguese football player (Benfica, national team) and manager (CD Alcains).
- Debbie Drake, 94, American fitness and nutrition guru and television host (The Debbie Drake Show).
- Derek Draper, 81, Welsh footballer (Swansea City, Bradford Park Avenue, Chester City), complications from dementia.
- Johnny Gaudreau, 31, American ice hockey player (Calgary Flames, Columbus Blue Jackets), traffic collision.
- Javier Gómez-Navarro, 78, Spanish politician, minister of trade and tourism (1993–1996).
- Brent Hassert, 71, American politician, member of the Illinois House of Representatives (1993–2009).
- Sir John Jennings, 87, British geologist and businessman.
- Hervé Laurent, 67, French sailor.
- Alban Liechti, 89, French anti-colonial activist.
- Darrel J. McLeod, 67, Canadian Cree writer.
- Max Nemni, 89, Canadian political scientist and writer (Young Trudeau).
- A. G. Noorani, 93, Indian lawyer and political commentator.
- Mihaela Peneș, 77, Romanian javelin thrower, Olympic champion (1964) and silver medallist (1968).
- Ronald Shusett, 89, American screenwriter (Alien, Total Recall, Above the Law).
- Steve Silberman, 66, American writer (NeuroTribes) and editor (Wired), heart attack.
- Gerlinde Stobrawa, 75, German Stasi informant and politician, member (1990–2009) and vice president (2005–2009) of the Landtag of Brandenburg.
- Jean-Charles Tacchella, 98, French film director (Cousin Cousine, Seven Sundays) and screenwriter (Typhoon Over Nagasaki).
- Ēvī Upeniece, 99, Latvian sculptor.
- Pilar Marie Victoriá, 28, Puerto Rican volleyball player (Texas Longhorns, Arkansas Razorbacks).
- Villano V, 62, Mexican professional wrestler (UWA, AAA, WCW).

=== 30 ===
- George Berci, 103, Hungarian-American surgeon, COVID-19.
- Janusz Marian Danecki, 72, Polish Roman Catholic prelate, auxiliary bishop of Campo Grande (since 2015).
- Hans Danuser, 71, Swiss visual artist and photographer.
- Michelle Fazzari, 37, Canadian Olympic wrestler (2016), cancer.
- Nicky Gavron, 82, British politician, deputy mayor of London (2000–2003, 2004–2008).
- Jack Hibberd, 84, Australian playwright (Dimboola) and physician.
- Daniela Hodrová, 78, Czech writer and literary scholar.
- Edmund Kaczor, 67, German footballer (SC Preußen Münster).
- Robert Otto Pohl, 94, German-American physicist.
- Oswaldo Ramos Soto, 77, Honduran jurist, politician, and academic administrator, MP (2006–2022), chief judge of the Supreme Court (1990–1992), and rector of UNAH (1982–1988).
- Sir Shridath Ramphal, 95, Guyanese diplomat, politician, and academic administrator, Commonwealth secretary-general (1975–1990), minister of foreign affairs (1972–1975), and chancellor of the UWI (1989–2003).
- Simone Roganti, 21, Italian road racing cyclist, heart attack.
- Neale Thompson, 87, New Zealand cricketer (Southland, Otago).
- Tūheitia, 69, New Zealand Māori monarch, king (since 2006), complications from heart surgery.
- William Glover, 98, American actor.
- Zhong Qihuang, 80, Chinese politician.
- Robertas Žulpa, 64, Lithuanian swimmer, Olympic champion (1980).
- Jack Zussman, 100, British crystallographer and mineralogist (An Introduction to the Rock-Forming Minerals).

=== 31 ===
- Maria do Carmo Alves, 83, Brazilian politician, senator (1999–2023), pancreatic cancer.
- Robert Arnott, 72–73, British medical archaeologist and historian.
- Sol Bamba, 39, Ivorian-French footballer (Hibernian, Cardiff City, Ivory Coast national team), non-Hodgkin lymphoma.
- Mislav Bezmalinović, 57, Croatian water polo player, Olympic champion (1988).
- Stevie Cameron, 80, Canadian journalist (Ottawa Journal, Ottawa Citizen) and author.
- Euan Clarkson, 87, British palaeontologist and writer.
- John Devaney, 66, Canadian ice hockey player (EHC Visp, 1980 Winter Olympics).
- Ivan Deveson, 90, Australian businessman and politician, lord mayor of the City of Melbourne (1996–1999).
- Ros Evans, 74, British athlete.
- Fatman Scoop, 56, American hip hop artist ("Be Faithful", "Lose Control", "It's Like That"), heart disease.
- Hersh Goldberg-Polin, 23, Israeli-American Hamas hostage. (body discovered on this date)
- Peter Gresham, 91, New Zealand politician, MP (1990–1999), minister of social welfare (1993–1996) and senior citizens (1993–1996).
- Hvaldimir, Norwegian beluga whale. (body discovered on this date)
- Jay Justin, 84, Australian rock singer-songwriter.
- Len Kent, 94, Australian footballer (Footscray).
- Sonny King, 79, American professional wrestler (WWWF).
- Henri Leclerc, 90, French criminal defense lawyer.
- Christoph Lehmann, 77, German musician.
- Karl-Heinz Luck, 79, German Nordic combined skier, Olympic bronze medallist (1972).
- Daniel Anthony Manion, 82, American jurist and politician, judge of the U.S. Court of Appeals for the Seventh Circuit (since 1986), member of the Indiana Senate (1978–1982).
- Sir Harold Marshall, 92, New Zealand acoustician and architect, Fellow of the Royal Society of New Zealand (since 1994).
- Jessica Mbangeni, 47, South African imbongi and singer.
- Arnold Oberschelp, 92, German mathematician.
- Noel Parmentel, 98, American essayist.
- Paul Rubin, 82, American economist.
- Thabiso Sikwane, 50, South African radio and television personality.
- Phil Swern, 76, English radio producer (Sounds of the 60s, Pick of the Pops).
- Willie Zingani, 70, Malawian author and journalist.
