= Renato Ricci (disambiguation) =

Renato Ricci is a human name from Italian language or culture, may refer to:

- Renato Ricci, was an Italian fascist politician
- Renato Ricci (Italian footballer), an Italian association footballer
- Renato Ricci (Australian footballer), an Australian rules footballer

== See also ==
- Renato, a given name
- Ricci, a surname
