= Edward M. Stricker =

American neuroscientist (1941–2024)

Edward M. Stricker (22 May 1941 — 22 August 2024) was an American neuroscientist and a university professor at the University of Pittsburgh and Dean at its Honors College.

Stricker was born in New York, NY in 1941 and earned a bachelor's degree from the University of Chicago in 1960, a master's degree in chemistry from that same institution in 1961, and a PhD in psychology from Yale University in 1965. He held faculty positions at McMaster University in Hamilton, Ontario from 1967 to 1971, and at the University of Pittsburgh from 1971 to 1986, before being named University Professor in 1986.

His research career spanned four decades and focused on various aspects of homeostasis, most prominently the physiological and behavioral contributions to body fluid balance, and recovery of function following damage to brain catecholamine-containing neurons. For this work he received the research scientist award from the U.S. National Institute of Mental Health (1981–1986) and the distinguished career award from the Society for the Study of Ingestive Behavior (2015).

During his academic career, Stricker served in various administrative roles at the University of Pittsburgh, including director of the behavioral neuroscience program (1983–1986), founding chair of the department of neuroscience (1986–2002), founding director of the center for neuroscience and schizophrenia (1990–1995), co-director of the center for neuroscience (1996–2002), and Dean of the University Honors College (2011–2017).

His teaching ranged from introductory courses to graduate courses in neuroscience, as well as interdisciplinary honors courses. In recognition of his teaching, the University of Pittsburgh awarded him the 2001 Tina & David Bellet Teaching Excellence Award and 1992 Chancellor's Distinguished Teaching Award.
