= Iurie Păsat =

Moldovan politician (1972–2024)

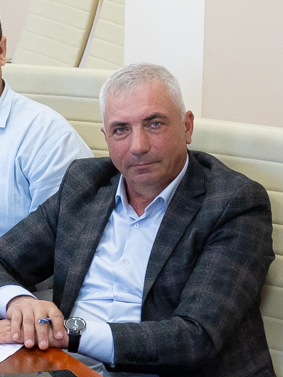
- Păsat in April 2024

Member of the Moldovan Parliament
- In office 23 July 2021 – 5 August 2024
- Succeeded by: Oleg Botnaru
- Parliamentary group: Party of Action and Solidarity

Mayor of Bălceana
- In office 20 October 2019 – 23 July 2021
- Preceded by: Valentin Chiorescu
- Succeeded by: Nicolae Guștiuc
- In office 5 June 2011 – 14 June 2015
- Succeeded by: Valentin Chiorescu

Personal details
- Born: 9 August 1972 Bălceana, Moldavian SSR, Soviet Union
- Died: 5 August 2024 (aged 51) Chișinău, Moldova

Iurie Păsat (9 August 1972 – 5 August 2024) was a Moldovan politician. He served as mayor of the village of Bălceana, Hîncești District, from 2011 until 2015 and again from 2019 to 2021. He was then elected to the Parliament of Moldova as a member of the Party of Action and Solidarity (PAS), where he served from 2021 until his death in office on 5 August 2024. He held the position of vice-president in the Parliamentary Committee on Agriculture and the Food Industry while serving as an MP.

Păsat was born on 9 August 1972, and died from anaphylactic shock in Chișinău, on 5 August 2024, at the age of 51.
