= Annick de Souzenelle =

French writer (1922–2024)

Annick du Réau de La Gaignonnière (née Meaulle, 4 November 1922 – 11 August 2024), better known by the pseudonym Annick de Souzenelle, was a French writer who studied spirituality. De Souzenelle died on 11 August 2024, at the age of 101.

== Publications ==
- De l'arbre de vie au schéma corporel, le symbolisme du corps humain, éditions Dangles, coll. « Horizons ésotériques », 1977.
- L'Égypte intérieure ou les dix plaies de l'âme, Albin Michel, collection « Espaces Libres », 1991.
- Le Symbolisme du corps humain, Albin Michel, collection « Espaces Libres », 1991.
- La lettre, chemin de vie : Le symbolisme des lettres hébraïques, Albin Michel, coll. « Spiritualités vivantes », Paris, 1993, 340 p. ISBN 2-226-06512-1
- La Parole au cœur du corps, entretiens avec Jean Mouttapa, Albin Michel, 1993 et coll. « Espaces Libres », 1997
- Job sur le chemin de la lumière, Albin Michel, 1994, 1999 ISBN 2-226-07022-2, 202 pages
- Le Féminin de l’être. Pour en finir avec la côte d'Adam, Albin Michel, 2000
- Œdipe intérieur, Albin Michel, 1998, 2008
- Manifeste pour une mutation intérieure, Éditions du Relié, 2003
- L'arc et la flèche, Albin Michel, 2003
- L'alliance oubliée, Albin Michel, 2005
- Résonances bibliques, Albin Michel, coll. Spiritualités vivantes, 2006 ISBN 978-2226172877
- Alliance de feu (2 tomes), Albin Michel, 2007
- Le Baiser de Dieu, Albin Michel, 2008
- Jonas. Nous sommes coupés en deux, Éditions du Relié, 2008
- Cheminer avec l'ange, Éditions du Relié, 2010
- L'initiation (avec Pierre-Yves Albrecht), Éditions du Relié, 2012
- Va vers toi, Albin Michel, 2013.
- Le Seigneur et le Satan. Au-delà du bien et du mal, Albin Michel, 2016 ISBN 9782226320179
- Le Livre des guérisons. Les Évangiles en eaux profondes, Albin Michel, 2017
- Le grand retournement - La généalogie d'Adam aujourd'hui, Le Relié, 2020
- Elle participe à l’ouvrage de Marc Welinski, Comment bien vivre la fin de ce monde, Éditions Guy Trédaniel, mars 2021.
- Deviens ton Seigneur intérieur !, Éditions L'Originel-Charles Antoni, novembre 2022 ISBN 9782383570165.
- Méditation sur la Mort, Le Relié, 2023.

=== Collections ===
- Un et nu, Albin Michel, 1991
- Écologie et spiritualité, Albin Michel, 2006
