= Alan Stone (political scientist) =

American political scientist and writer

- Born: Alan Sulsky; July 28, 1931
- Died: August 26, 2024 (aged 93); Encinitas, California, U.S.
- Education: Union College; University of Chicago; Columbia Law School
- Occupations: Political scientist, writer

Alan Sulsky (July 28, 1931 – August 26, 2024) was an American political scientist and writer.

== Life and career ==
Stone was born on July 28, 1931. He earned his BA degree at Union College. He also earned his MS degree and PhD degree at the University of Chicago, and earned his LLB degree at Columbia Law School. He practiced law in New York, and worked as a trial attorney with the Federal Trade Commission in Washington, D.C. He briefly taught at Rutgers University.

Stone served as a professor in the department of political science at the University of Houston from 1976 to 2000. During his years as a professor, he was named a distinguished professor, and he wrote the books Public Service Liberalism: Telecommunications and Transitions in Public Policy, Economic Regulation and the Public Interest, the Federal Trade Commission in Theory and Practice, Regulation and Its Alternatives, Wrong Number: The Breakup of AT&T and Nationalizing Government: Public Policies in America.

== Death ==
Stone died from Alzheimer's disease on August 26, 2024, in Encinitas, California, at the age of 93.
