= Klaus Dockhorn =

German swimmer (1953–2024)

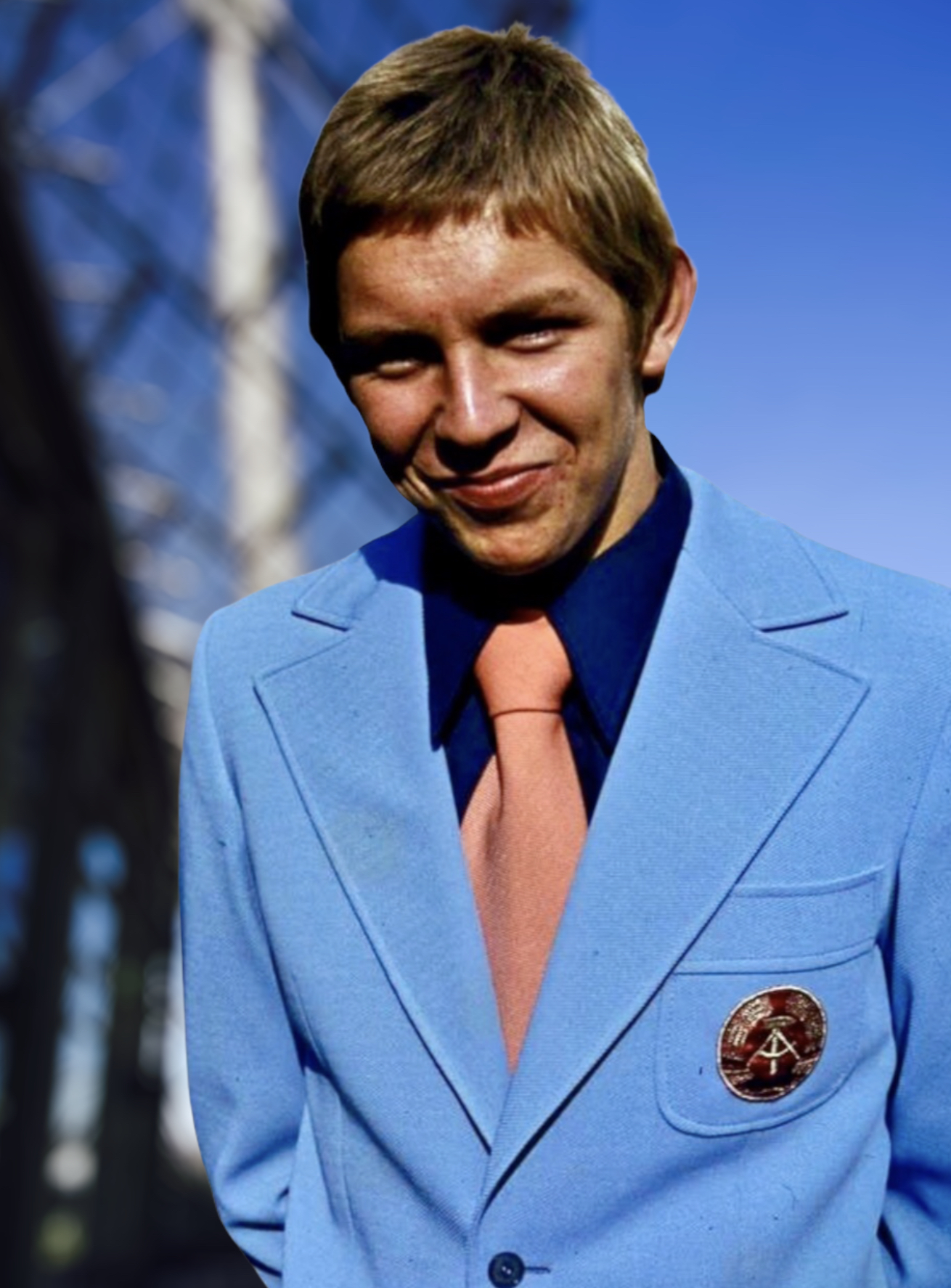
- Dockhorn in 1972

Personal information
- Born: 1 June 1953 Heilbronn, Baden-Württemberg, West Germany
- Died: 17 August 2024 (aged 71)

Sport
- Sport: Swimming

Klaus Dockhorn (1 June 1953 – 17 August 2024) was a German swimmer. He competed for East Germany in two events at the 1972 Summer Olympics. Dockhorn died on 19 August 2024, at the age of 71.
