= Raymond Windsor =

English cricketer

Raymond Thomas Albert Windsor (9 February 1943 – 14 August 2024) was an English cricketer who played first-class and List A cricket for Somerset in 1969. He was born at Wellington, Somerset.

Windsor was a right-handed batsman and occasional bowler who made a lot of runs in club cricket for Wellington and Taunton. In August 1969, playing for Somerset's second eleven in a Minor Counties Championship match against Cornwall he hit 140 out of 225 in Somerset's first innings. That earned him a fairly instant call-up into Somerset's first team for a List A Sunday League match against Yorkshire, but Somerset won easily by nine wickets, and he was not required to bat or to bowl. Later in the same month, he was picked for a single County Championship match against Sussex; he batted at No 7 and was out, bowled by Tony Greig, without scoring in the first innings, and the second Somerset innings finished at 220 for four wickets, so he did not bat a second time. He was not picked for the first team again, though he continued to appear in sporadic second eleven games to 1978.

Windsor died in August 2024, at the age of 81.
