= Elly Cordiviola =

Argentine ichthyologist (1940–2024)

- Born: Elly Ana Cordiviola de Yuan; 7 August 1940; Santo Tomé, Santa Fe Province, Argentina
- Died: 18 August 2024 (aged 84)
- Education: National University of the Littoral
- Occupation: ichthyologist
- Known for: pioneering research of fish species in Argentina
- Notable work: authored more than 50 scientific journal publications, studies, articles, and book collaborations

Elly Ana Cordiviola de Yuan (7 August 1940 – 18 August 2024) was an Argentine ichthyologist known for her pioneering research of fish species in Argentina. Cordiviola was particularly recognized for her study of fish in the Paraná River and its tributaries. The country's fish biodiversity was poorly studied prior to her work.

== Biography ==
Cordiviola was born in Santo Tomé, Santa Fe Province on 7 August 1940. She graduated from the National University of the Littoral in Santa Fe, Argentina, with degree in zoology and a research specialization in the study of fisheries. In 1960, she became a founding member of the university's Association of Natural Sciences.

Cordiviola began her scientific career as a research fellow at the National Scientific and Technical Research Council (CONICET) in 1961, with a focus on the fish of the middle Paraná River. She served as the director of the National Institute of Limnology (Instituto Nacional de Limnología, INALI) from January 1977 to March 1984. She later became its interim director again from March 1997 until October 2001.

Cordiviola authored more than 50 scientific journal publications, studies, articles, and book collaborations. She was part of the first team of researchers from the National University of the Littoral, led by Dr. Argentino Bonetto, to study fish biodiversity on the lagoons of the Salado River. Together with colleagues, including Bonetto, Clarice Pignalberi de Hassan, and Olga Oliveros, Cordiviola also conducted groundbreaking research into Argentina's fish biodiversity, including identifying new species and studying fish migrations. During her retirement, Cordiviola carried out independent studies of the Jaaukanigás wetlands in Santa Fe Province.

Elly Cordiviola died on 18 August 2024, at the age of 83.
