= Néstor Salvador Quintana =

Argentine politician (1933–2024)

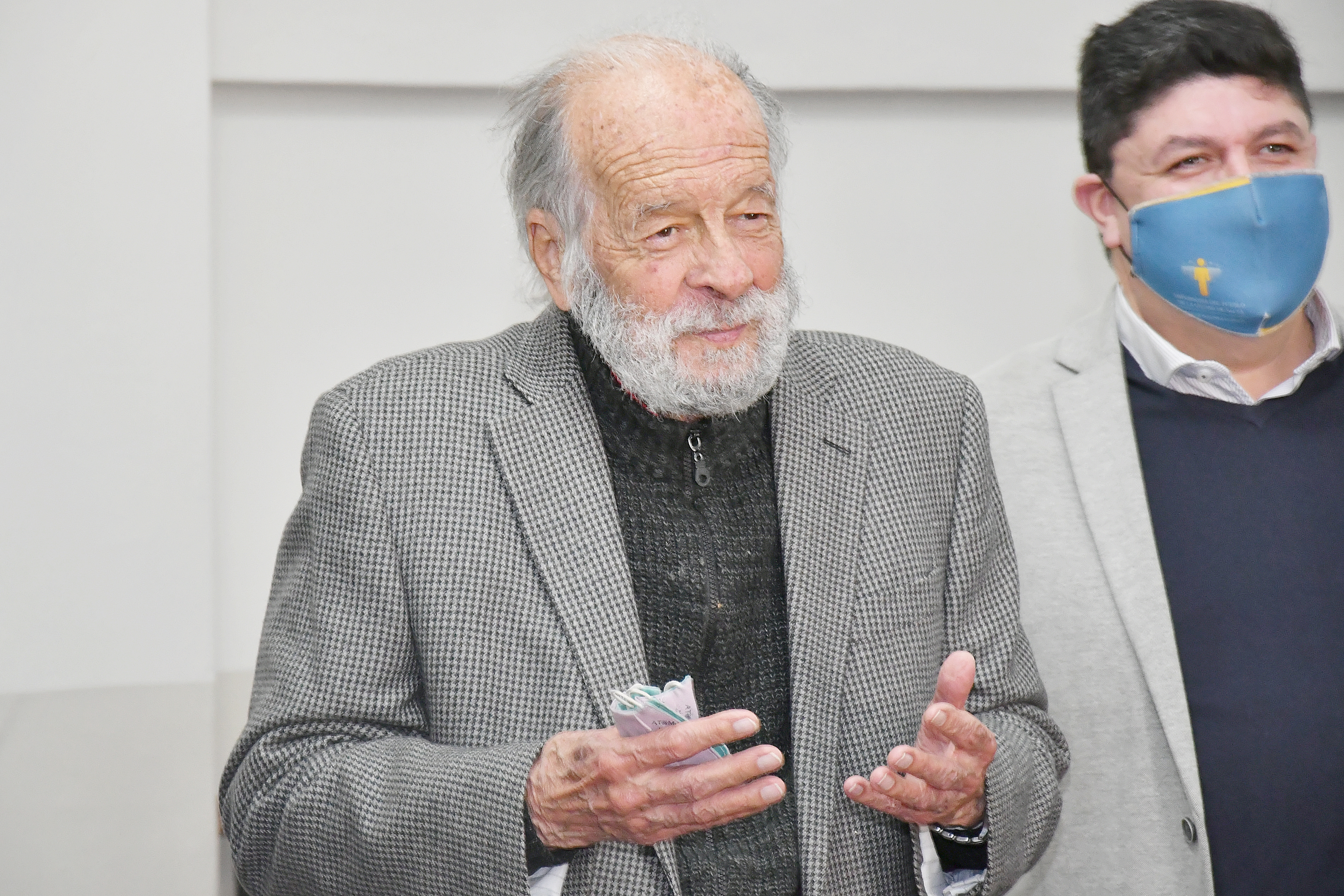
- Quintana in 2021

Member of the Chamber of Deputies of Salta for the Capital Department
- In office 24 November 1985 – 23 November 1989

Intendant of Salta
- In office 30 July 1982 – 10 December 1983
- Preceded by: Rodolfo Aniceto Fernández
- Succeeded by: Roberto Adán Galli

Personal details
- Born: 27 August 1933 Salta, Argentina
- Died: 19 August 2024 (aged 90)
- Political party: UCR
- Education: National University of Córdoba
- Occupation: Journalist

Néstor Salvador Quintana (27 August 1933 – 19 August 2024) was an Argentine journalist and politician. A member of the Radical Civic Union, he served as intendant of Salta from 1982 to 1983 and was a member of the Chamber of Deputies of Salta from 1985 to 1989.

Quintana died on 19 August 2024, at the age of 90.
