= Ida Bagus Ardana =

Indonesian politician (1939/1940–2024)

Chairman of the Bali Regional Development Agency
- In office 1994–1999
- Governor: Ida Bagus Oka; Dewa Made Beratha
- Preceded by: I Wayan Rendha
- Succeeded by: Ida Bagus Ngurah Kasayatna

7th Regent of Jembrana
- In office 26 August 1980 – 27 August 1990
- Governor: Ida Bagus Mantra; Ida Bagus Oka
- Preceded by: Liek Rochadi
- Succeeded by: Ida Bagus Indugosa

Personal details
- Born: 1939 or 1940 Buleleng, Dutch East Indies
- Died: 8 August 2024 (aged 84) Denpasar, Indonesia
- Party: Golkar
- Spouses: I Gusti Ayu Komang Mulati (died 1989): Ayu Sri Wulan Trisna

Ida Bagus Ardana (1939 or 1940 – 8 August 2024) was an Indonesian bureaucrat and politician. He held several positions in the Bali provincial government, such as the Regent of Jembrana from 1980 to 1990 and the chairman of the Bali Regional Development Agency from 1994 to 1999. He was also the deputy chairman of Golkar in Bali from 1993 until 1998.

== Early life ==
Ardana was born in 1939 or 1940 in Buleleng as the oldest child of ten. He spent most of his childhood in the region before moving to Jember in East Java to pursue further studies.

== Career ==
Ardana joined the civil service in 1969 after completing his education in Jember. He was assigned to the Jembrana regional government and held several important position in the local government. Regent Liek Rochadi appointed him as the regional secretary—the most senior civil servant position—in February 1977. In August 1980 Ardana replaced Liek Rochadi as the regent of Jembrana.

As regent, Ardana implemented the concept of "equal development" for Jembrana and constructed roads to villages. His efforts led the regency to receive the Parasamya Purna Karya Nugraha award in 1982, which was handed over to Ardana by three ministers. Ardana also actively promoted transmigration to Sulawesi. In religious matters, Ardana issued a permit for the construction of the Gilimanuk parish church in 1987, which closed a decade later. He was popular among the Jembrana population for his frequent involvement in community activities. Ardana was also known for his discipline, and once locked a civil servant, who was late for a meeting, outside.

Ardana was replaced by Ida Bagus Indugosa in September 1990. Upon completing his ten-year tenure as regent, he was appointed as the second assistant to the provincial secretary of Bali, responsible for development administration. In this office, Ardana represented the Bali governor on several occasions. Ardana was appointed as the chairman of the Bali Regional Development Agency in 1994 and served in the office until 1999. He was responsible for managing development aid for Bali from various sources, such as the World Bank. He was also active in politics during this period and became the deputy chairman of Golkar in Bali from 1993 to 1998.

== Personal life ==
Ardana's first wife, I Gusti Ayu Komang Muliati, gave birth to two children. Muliati died on 28 January 1989. Ardana then married Ayu Sri Wulan Tisna. He had a daughter from his second marriage.

On 8 August 2024, Ardana and his wife were found dead at their house in Denpasar by his sister-in-law, who entered the house after receiving no response. Ardana's body was found in the kitchen with traces of blood, while Tisna was found in the bedroom. Emergency services evacuated the body four hours after it was discovered for an autopsy. Initial investigation from the police indicated that the Ardana had been dead for a day before he was discovered. Police have recovered food and drug leftovers as evidence from Ardana's house.
