= Jacques Delisle =

Canadian judge (1935–2024)

Jacques Delisle (May 4, 1935 – August 10, 2024) was a Canadian judge who sat on the Quebec Superior Court from 1985 to 1992, and on the Quebec Court of Appeal from 1992 until his retirement in 2009. In June 2010, he was arrested, charged and subsequently convicted of murder, in connection with the November 2009 death of his wife Marie-Nicole Rainville.

Delisle was the first judge in Canadian history to be charged with murder. His trial began in May 2012; it had been scheduled to begin in 2011, but was delayed after one of the prosecutors withdrew. On June 14, 2012, Delisle was found guilty of first-degree murder for killing his wife.

He subsequently appealed his conviction; in May 2013, the Quebec Court of Appeal upheld the decision, and in December 2013, the Supreme Court of Canada declined to hear his case.

== Later developments ==
Delisle, who did not testify at his trial, stated in March 2015 that his wife had committed suicide with a gun which he had supplied, a position reportedly supported by forensic experts. On March 19, 2015, Justice Minister Peter MacKay announced that he would take under consideration Delisle's request for a new trial.

On April 7, 2021, Federal Justice Minister David Lametti ordered a new trial for Delisle. Both the sentence and conviction were set aside.

On April 8, 2022, Quebec Superior Court Justice Jean-François Émond ruled that Delisle would not face a second trial.

On April 28, 2022, the Directeur des poursuites criminelles et pénales (DPCP) appealed Émond's decision. On Mar 14, 2024, Delisle pleaded guilty to manslaughter in the death of his wife, and was sentenced to one day in jail. He was released a free man later that day.

Delisle died on August 10, 2024, at the age of 89.
