= Raly Tejada =

Filipino diplomat and lawyer (1971–2024)

Raly Lofamia Tejada (February 1, 1971 – August 20, 2024) was a Filipino diplomat and lawyer who served as the Consul General of the Philippines in Hong Kong. After graduating from the University of the Philippines Diliman College of Law in 1996, Tejada began his career with the Philippine Department of Foreign Affairs, with multiple postings in various countries, including Hong Kong, Canada, and Malaysia. He returned to Hong Kong in 2019 as Consul General during the peak of the 2019–2020 Hong Kong protests and the COVID-19 pandemic in Hong Kong. He advocated for the rights of Filipino domestic workers in the city and actively criticized local media representations of Filipinos to defend the dignity of his community. He was also graduated from Hong Kong University of Science and Technology with a Master of Public Management. Tejada stepped down as Consul General in December 2023 and was subsequently promoted to Assistant Secretary of Foreign Affairs in January 2024. However, he died from an abdominal aortic aneurysm on August 20, 2024, at the age of 53. His funeral took place in Quezon City.
