= Society for the Study of Ingestive Behavior =

Organization

The Society for the Study of Ingestive Behavior (SSIB) is an organization committed to advancing scientific research on food and fluid intake and its associated biological, psychological and social processes. The Society provides a multidisciplinary environment for the free exchange of ideas and information, and serves as a resource for scientific expertise and education on topics related to the study of ingestive behavior.

Its approximately 600 members hail from many different nations and include psychologists, neuroscientists, psychiatrists, physiologists, nutritionists, food scientists, and many others who are interested in research on eating and drinking. Thus, the organization is quite interdisciplinary.

SSIB's origins can be traced to the annual meeting of the Eastern Psychological Association where it was a satellite meeting. Its first independent meeting occurred in 1992 at Princeton University and it has held an annual meeting since in various locations in the United States, Europe, and Canada.

== Meetings ==
Year	City	Year	City
1992	Princeton, New Jersey	1993	Oxford, England
1994	Hamilton, Ontario	1995	Baton Rouge, Louisiana
1996	Banff, Alberta	1997	Baltimore, Maryland
1998	Pécs, Hungary	1999	Clearwater, Florida
2000	Dublin, Ireland	2001	Philadelphia, Pennsylvania
2002	Santa Cruz, California	2003	Groningen, Netherlands
2004	Cincinnati, Ohio	2005	Pittsburgh, Pennsylvania
2006	Naples, Florida	2007	Steamboat Springs, Colorado
2008	Paris, France	2009	Portland, Oregon
2010	Pittsburgh, Pennsylvania	2011	Clearwater, Florida
2012	Zurich, Switzerland	2013	New Orleans, Louisiana
2014	Seattle, Washington	2015	Denver, Colorado
2016	Porto, Portugal	2017	Montreal, Quebec
2018	Bonita Springs, Florida	2019	Utrecht, Netherlands
2020	canceled	2021	virtual
2022	Porto, Portugal	2023	Portland, Oregon
2024	Chicago, Illinois	2025	Oxford, England
