= Hinke Luiten =

Dutch fashion designer (1955–2024)

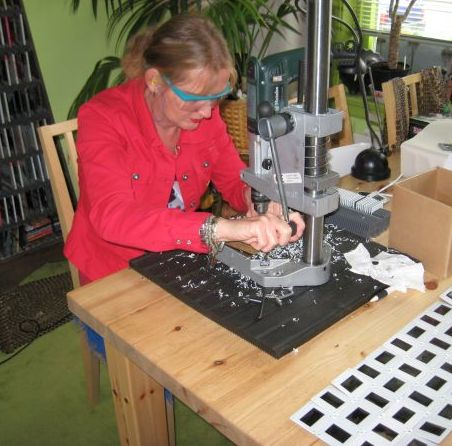
- Luiten in 2007
- Born: 14 April 1955; Haarlem, Netherlands
- Died: 1 August 2024 (aged 69); Deventer, Netherlands

Hinke Maria Luiten (14 April 1955 – 1 August 2024) was a Dutch fashion designer and artist.

== Biography ==
Hinke Luiten was born in Haarlem and grew up in Enschede. She was the daughter of A. Pols (mother) and G. Luiten (father) and the younger sister of writer Hetty Luiten. She lived in Deventer from 1985. In 1992, she obtained her diploma from the ENSAID seamstress training program.

Luiten died in Deventer on 1 August 2024, at the age of 69.

== Career ==
Due to a lack of money, Luiten started experimenting with various waste materials, which she used to make wearable art clothing. She made headlines in the media with these creations. For example, on 21 February 2002, an episode of Het Klokhuis was dedicated to her designs. Due to her increasing fame, she was offered more and more materials. For example, Luiten received broken balls from football club Go Ahead Eagles, from which she made a dress that was signed by the first team. Her work has led to interviews, fashion shows and presentations throughout the country. During Queen's Day 2003 in Deventer, several of her designs were shown to the Royal visit. Luiten made a 10-kilo dress from 9,350 buttons from the Deventer Button Factory, which was exhibited in the regional museum in Dokkum in 2003, after which the dress was used for the international exhibition Pracht & Kraal in the Tropenmuseum in 2005. Because Deventer was the first city in Europe to be equipped with a fibre optic network in 2009, Luiten was commissioned to make a wearable fibre optic artwork in the shape of a peacock. Since 2015, the vinyl singlet dress has been on display at the RockArt museum in Hoek van Holland. A dress made from old city maps of Deventer is in the city hall of Deventer. Luiten has also filled empty shop windows with her creations. In the spring of 2024, Luiten will exhibit 20 creations at the exhibition "Anders Kijken" in the Museum van de Vrouw in Echt.

In addition to various waste materials, including expired moped plates and coffee capsules, Luiten also used money as a material. In 2017, she designed a jacket for De Nederlandsche Bank made from 50-euro notes, on the occasion of the introduction of the new 50-euro note. On Prinsjesdag 2021, Member of Parliament Hilde Palland wore a collar, bag and bracelet by Luiten, made from quarters. In 2007, she had already made a - 19.5 kilos - cent dress.

During her career as an artist, Luiten created a total of 120 wearable art creations. In 2021, she stopped working.

== Award ==
Luiten received the Cultural Incentive Prize of Deventer in 1997.
