= Suzanne Kala Lobè =

Cameroonian journalist and activist (1953–2024)

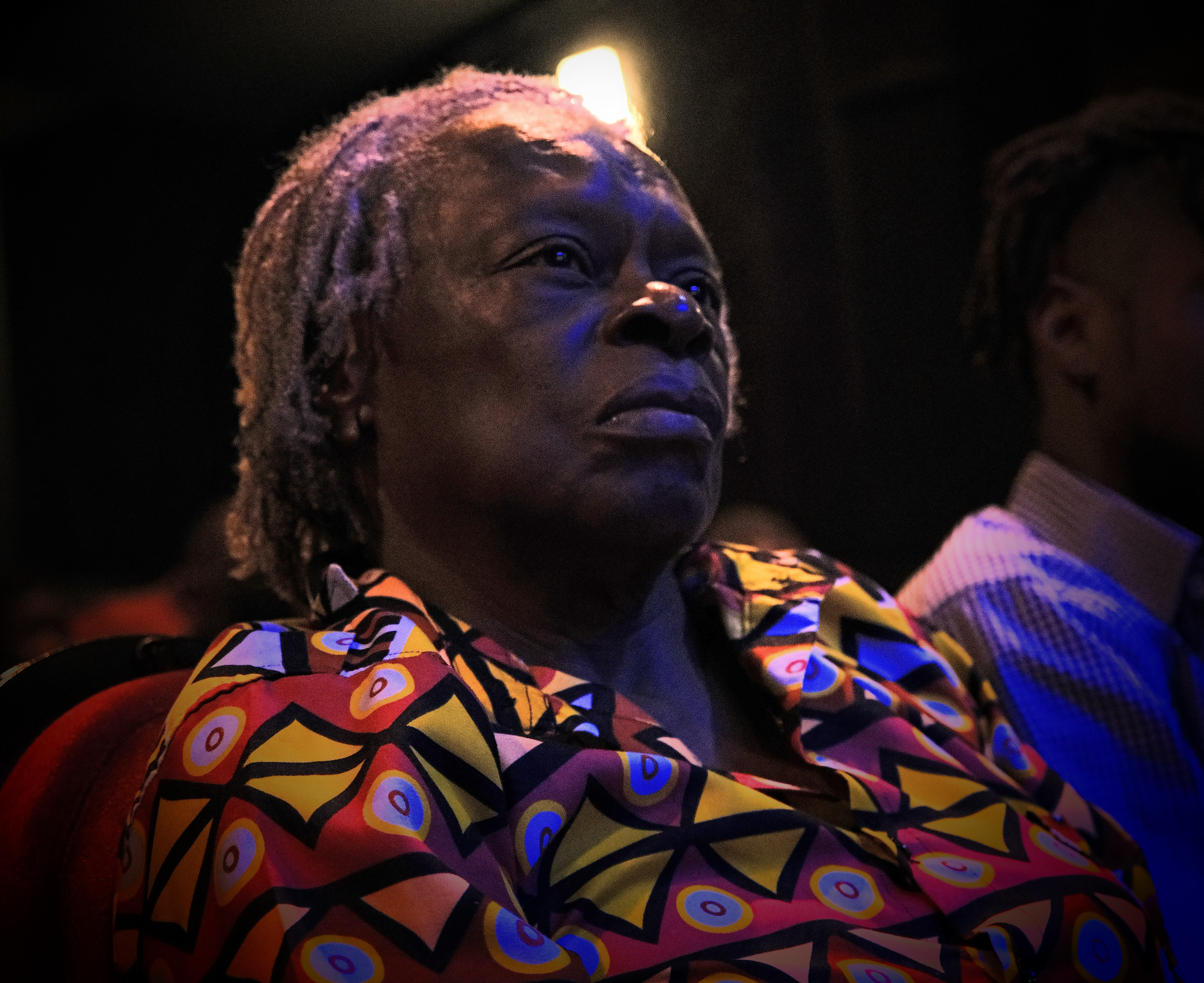
- Kala Lobè in 2023
- Born: 16 January 1953; Douala, French Cameroon
- Died: July/August 2024 (aged 71)
- Education: University Paris-III, University of Bordeaux
- Occupations: Journalist and activist
- Years active: 1992–2024
- Notable work: Les Chroniques sous le manguier, Supermarket
- Spouse: Bea Man Wayack
- Children: None

Suzanne Kala Lobè (16 January 1953 – July/August 2024) was a Cameroonian journalist and activist. She was a member of the National Communication Council of Cameroon.

== Early life ==
Suzanne Bema Kala Lobè was born on 16 January 1953, in Douala, Cameroon. She was the daughter of Sara Beboi Kutta Kala-Lobè and Iwiyè Kala-Lobè, a pioneering Cameroonian journalist. She grew up in a family of eight children and attended primary school at Petit Joss in Akwa. She lived in Cameroon until the age of 10 before continuing her studies in France.

== Education ==
She earned a doctorate in linguistics in 1976 from the University Paris-III and an MBA in cultural management in 1989. Her thesis on Les grandeurs et dissidences au sein d’un parti politique : cas de l’UPC also earned her a DEA in political science in 1997 from the University of Bordeaux.

== Career ==
In 1992, inspired by her father Iwiyè Kala-Lobè (1917–1991), a journalist and founder of Présence Africaine, Kala Lobè embarked on her own journalism career at the daily newspaper La Nouvelle Expression. She gained attention with her column Ma candidate serait une femme ("My Candidate Would Be a Woman") during the Cameroonian presidential elections. Over the years, she worked with various media outlets, including hosting programs on Radio Équinoxe, which she helped found, and Équinoxe Télévision. She later founded a production company, EBK Productions, and launched the magazine Actu on Canal 2 International.

In October 2010, Kala Lobè published the book Les Chroniques sous le manguier, edited by Jacques Marie Lafon, and in 2012 she co-authored Supermarket, published by Le Bec en L'air.

A letter Kala Lobè published in la Nouvelle Expression on 20 July 2009, addressed to the Cameroonian diaspora, sparked controversy among Cameroonian media outlets. It argued that members of the diaspora were detached from realities on the ground in her country.

In addition to her journalism career, Suzanne Kala Lobè was politically involved, engaging in left-wing activism from a young age. She was a member of the National Communication Council of Cameroon beginning on 23 February 2013, appointed by President Paul Biya.

She also handled communication for the general management of the sanitation company Hysacam.

== Personal life and death ==
Suzanne Kala Lobè's partner was the musician Bea Man Wayack. On 5 October 2020, she lost her childhood home in Bali in an unexplained fire.

On 1 August 2024, it was announced that Lobè had died after a brief illness in Douala, at the age of 71. On her death, she was described as a "strong voice" in Cameroonian journalism.
