= Mark Jury =

American photographer (1944–2024)

- Born: July 4, 1944
- Died: August 27, 2024 (aged 80)
- Occupations: Photographer, filmmaker
- Notable work: The Vietnam Photo Book

Mark Jury (July 4, 1944 – August 27, 2024) was an American photographer and filmmaker known for his photographs of the Vietnam War. His 1971 book, The Vietnam Photo Book, was one of the first publications to detail the raw realities of the American side of the conflict. Jury died on August 27, 2024, at the age of 80.

== Filmography ==
- Chillysmith Farm (1981)
- Dances Sacred and Profane (1985)
