= George M. Wilson (philosopher) =

American philosopher

George M. Wilson (1942-August 22, 2024) was an American philosopher recognized for his contributions to philosophy and film studies. He held academic positions as a professor of philosophy at Johns Hopkins University and the University of California, Davis, and later served as a professor of philosophy and cinematic arts at the University of Southern California.

== Early life and education ==
Wilson was born and raised in Oregon. He studied at the University of Kansas, where he earned his AB in philosophy, and then completed his Ph.D. at Cornell University with a dissertation on the nature of natural numbers.

== Academic career ==
Wilson’s academic career spanned various fields, including the philosophy of language, theory of action, and Wittgenstein's philosophy.

Wilson's first book, The Intentionality of Human Action (1980), discussed intentional action and the knowledge individuals have of their own actions. He also wrote on Saul Kripke, contributing to his interpretation of Wittgenstein, particularly concerning rule-following and meaning.

In the late 1970s, while teaching at Johns Hopkins, Wilson became interested in aesthetics and wrote influential articles on films by Hitchcock and Max Ophuls which applied philosophical scrutiny to close readings of the films and their narrative structure. Wilson's work focused on formal complexity and a curiosity about point of view and self-reflexivity in cinema.

His early work on film was eventually compiled in his book, Narration in Light: Studies in Cinematic Point of View (1986). His later publication, Seeing Fictions in Film: The Epistemology of Movies (2011), further developed his thoughts on the nature of cinema.

Wilson is particularly noted for his "Imagined Seeing Thesis" within the philosophy of film, which explores how viewers of fiction films perceive and interact with the narrative through imagined visual perspectives.

== Awards ==
- Fellow at the National Humanities Center, 1994-95
- Fellow at the Council for Humanities, Princeton University, April 2008

== Selected works ==
=== Books ===
- Wilson, George M. The Intentionality of Human Action. Stanford University Press, 1989. ISBN 0804715459.
- Wilson, George M. Narration in Light: Studies in Cinematic Point of View. Johns Hopkins University Press, 1986. ISBN 9780801837500.
- Wilson, George M. Seeing Fictions in Film: The Epistemology of Movies. Oxford University Press, 2011. ISBN 9780199594894.

=== Articles ===
- Wilson, George M. "Film, Perception, and Point of View." Modern Language Notes, vol. 91, no. 6, 1976, pp. 1026-43.
- Wilson, George M. "'You Only Live Once': The Doubled Feature." Sight and Sound, vol. 46, no. 4, 1977, pp. 221-26.
- Wilson, George M. "On Definite and Indefinite Descriptions." Philosophical Review, vol. 87, no. 1, 1978, pp. 48-76.
- Wilson, George M. "Max Ophuls' Letter from an Unknown Woman." Modern Language Notes, vol. 98, no. 5, 1983, pp. 1121-43.
- Wilson, George M. "Kripke's Wittgenstein and Semantic Realism." Philosophy and Phenomenological Research, vol. 58, no. 1, 1998, pp. 99-122.
- Wilson, George M. "Transparency and Twist in Narrative Fiction Film." Journal of Aesthetics and Art Criticism, vol. 64, no. 1, 2006, pp. 81-96.
- Wilson, George M. "Le Grand Imagier Steps Out: The Primitive Basis of Film Narration." Philosophical Topics, vol. 25, no. 1, 1997, pp. 295-318.
