= Susana Cano González =

Mexican politician (1949–2024)

- Born: 2 February 1949; Distrito Federal, Mexico
- Died: 10 August 2024 (aged 75)
- Occupations: Nurse, politician
- Political party: MORENA

Susana Cano González (2 June 1949 – 10 August 2024) was a Mexican nurse who worked in the Mexican Social Security Institute (IMSS) for 34 years and was later elected to the Chamber of Deputies on two occasions.

== Early life and career ==
Cano González was born in the northern Mexico City borough of Gustavo A. Madero in 1949 and graduated as a nursing technician in 1974. Employed at the IMSS from 1968 to 2002, she first worked as a nurse and was later appointed coordinator of nursing staff. She also acted as a nursing instructor.

In 2014 she was a founding member of the National Regeneration Movement (Morena). One of her first activities in the party was to provide party members with training on first aid and the application of injections. She also served as the party's territorial coordinator for the State of Mexico's 20th congressional district (Ojo de Agua, Tecámac) in 2016.

In the 2018 general election she was elected to the Chamber of Deputies as a proportional-representation member for the fifth electoral region. During the 64th session of Congress (2018–2021), she served on the lower house's committees for social security (as secretary), the rights of children and adolescents, and human rights.

She was re-elected for the fifth region in the 2021 mid-terms and, during the 65th congressional session (2021–2024), she served on the committees for social security (as secretary), housing, and public security.

== Personal life and death ==
Cano González was the mother of Rafael Estrada Cano, the technical secretary of Morena's National Executive Committee.

Cano González died in office on 10 August 2024, at the age of 75.
