= Qiao Shibo =

Chinese entrepreneur (1954–2024)

Qiao Shibo (October 1954 – August 5, 2024, Chinese: 乔世波), a native of Dalian, Liaoning Province, was an entrepreneur of People's Republic of China.

== Life history ==
Qiao Shibo enrolled in the Chinese Communist Party (CCP) in June 1982 during his studies at Jilin University, and commenced employment in August 1983. Beginning in 1983, he held successive positions as a disciplinary inspector for the Discipline Inspection Group of the Central Commission for Discipline Inspection within the Ministry of Foreign Trade and Economic Cooperation, and as the director of the CCP Committee. From 1992 to 1996, he held the positions of deputy general manager of the Human Resources Department and general manager of China Resources, and from 1996 to 1999, he served as the deputy general manager of the Human Resources Department at China Resources Group. Subsequently, from 1999 to 2000, he held the position of general manager at China Resources Petroleum Company. From 2000 to 2008, he was the assistant general manager and later the deputy general manager of China Resources Group. From 2008 to 2016, he occupied the role of general manager at China Resources Group. He died in Dongguan, Guangdong Province, on August 5, 2024, at the age of 69.
