= Michael Ernest Kassner =

American materials science engineer (1950–2024)

Michael Ernest Kassner (November 22, 1950 – August 18, 2024) was an American materials science engineer who served as the Choong Hoon Cho Chair and Professor of Chemical Engineering and Materials Science and Aerospace and Mechanical Engineering at the University of Southern California's Viterbi School of Engineering. He was a former director of research at the Office of Naval Research.

== Career ==
=== Education and early career ===
Kassner received a BSSE in Science-Engineering from Northwestern University in 1972, after which he served as an engineering officer in the U.S. Navy from 1972 to 1976. Kassner received an MS in metallurgical engineering from the Illinois Institute of technology in 1977 and Materials Science and Engineering from Stanford University in 1979, followed by a PhD in that field from Stanford in 1981.

After working in the Lawrence Livermore National Laboratory until 1990, where he was a Section Head in Physical Metallurgy, Kassner became affiliated with Oregon State University from 1990 to 2003, and was granted tenure there in 1992. There, he was both the Chevron and the Northwest Aluminum Professor of Mechanical Engineering, and winner of the 1995 College of Engineering Outstanding Sustained Research Award. In 2003, Kassner went to USC as department chair for the Department of Aerospace and Mechanical Engineering. Kassner held that position until 2009, and later became Choong Hoon Cho Chair and Professor of Chemical Engineering and Materials Science and Aerospace and Mechanical Engineering. He was also awarded the USC Faculty Mentoring award 2018 and the Illinois Inst. of Technology Professional Achievement award 2020 and the Oleg Sherby Medal for high temperature plasticity. Kassner also delivered about 100 invited technical talks at a variety of universities.

From 2009 to 2012, while maintaining his position at USC, Kassner also returned to the U.S. Navy to serve as director of research at the Office of Naval Research ("ONR"), where he managed an approximately one billion dollar basic research portfolio. He also, during his tenure, spoke publicly about the concerns of the Navy for finding a sufficient number of engineers to fulfill its needs at a time when many persons graduating with engineering degrees in the U.S. were foreign-born, and would return to their native countries. He was also among the officials who noted that potential retirements of Navy civilians could hamper the Navy's scientific and engineering workforces and, argued that "scientific health is a national security issue".

In 2011, Kassner announced the expansion of the National Math and Science Initiative for Military Families. In 2012, Kassner was awarded the Meritorious Public Service Medal, one of the highest honors that can be awarded to a private citizen by the U.S. Navy.

=== Return to academia and administration ===
Following his service in the ONR, Kassner returned to USC full-time. In June 2019, it was announced that Kassner would serve as Interim Chair of the Mork Family Department of Chemical Engineering and Materials Science.

=== Publications ===
Kassner "has authored or co-authored over 250 published articles and three books in the areas of fundamentals of creep plasticity in metals, the hot deformation of aluminum and aluminum alloys, and phase diagrams". In 2004, Kassner published one of his most widely cited works, a book entitled Fundamentals of Creep in Metals and Alloys.

== Personal life and death ==
Kassner was born on November 22, 1950, in Osaka, Japan. He and his family moved to Germany, then New Jersey, and settled in Redlands, California, He graduated from Redlands Senior High School.

Kassner died on August 18, 2024, at the age of 73.
