= Francesco Catanzariti =

Italian politician (1933–2024)

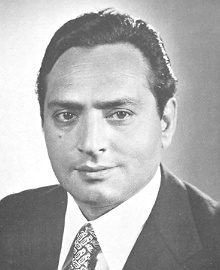
- Catanzariti in 1972

Member of the Chamber of Deputies of Italy for Calabria
- In office 25 May 1972 – 4 July 1976

Personal details
- Born: 10 January 1933 Platì, Italy
- Died: 7 August 2024 (aged 91) Reggio Calabria, Italy
- Party: PCI
- Occupation: Trade unionist

Francesco Catanzariti (10 January 1933 – 7 August 2024) was an Italian politician. A member of the Italian Communist Party, he served in the Chamber of Deputies from 1972 to 1976.

Catanzariti died in Reggio Calabria on 7 August 2024, at the age of 91.
