= Yvonne Delcour =

Belgian actress (1932–2024)

- Delcour In 2016
- Born: Yvonne Verschueren; 8 May 1932; Ghent, Belgium
- Died: 20 August 2024 (aged 92); Ghent, Belgium
- Occupation: Actress
- Spouse: Romain Deconinck

Yvonne Delcour was the pseudonym of Yvonne Verschueren (8 May 1932 – 20 August 2024), a Belgian actress. She is most known for playing Adrie in television series De kolderbrigade. She also had among others a guest role in television series De Collega's and in 2008 movie Moscow, Belgium.

After her first marriage, she married theater director Romain Deconinck. They also played together in the theater.

Delcour died on 20 August 2024, at the age of 92.
