= Sumana Nellampitiya =

Sri Lankan journalist (1944–2024)

Sumana Nellampitiya (Sinhala: සුමනා නෙල්ලම්පිටිය; 23 May 1944 – 8 August 2024) was a Sri Lankan broadcaster, journalist, radio announcer and television presenter. She was widely acknowledged as Sri Lanka's first television news anchor as well as Sri Lanka's first female television news anchor. She was hailed as a revered figure in the field of journalism and played an important role in cementing a legacy on Sri Lankan media landscape.

== Biography ==
Sumana was born in Colombo, on 23 May 1944. Sumana's talent was spotted during her schooling days. She pursued her primary and secondary education at three different schools namely; Nugegoda Mixed School, Sujatha Vidyalaya Nugegoda, and Gotami Balika Vidyalaya.

== Career ==
She initially plied her trade as an Air Force officer by joining the Sri Lanka Air Force. In November 1967, she joined the Sri Lanka Broadcasting Corporation as a relief announcer. She also made a smooth transition from radio to television. She joined the Rupavahini Corporation in 1982 as its first Sinhalese presenter. During her stint at the Rupavahini Corporation, she revealed the experience of having faced the wrath of the protestors during the critical juncture of India-Sri Lanka bilateral relations, when Indo-Sri Lanka Accord was signed to mitigate potential diplomatic standoff which was expected to escalate during the advent of the Sri Lanka Civil War. She and her team members were booed and attacked by mob during the historic occasion of Indo-Sri Lanka Accord.

Within a short period of time, she emerged as a household name in Sri Lanka after venturing into the role of a television news anchor. It was during her tenure, Sri Lankan media had undergone a transformation in visual media. She grabbed the attention of the general public by conducting programmes Pibidena Ga'yaka Parapura, Forens Vasana 7, and Ovalteen Pana Podi. She also honed skills in programme production, presenting, scriptwriting and editing, besides her primary role as an announcer during her illustrious career.

== Death ==
She died on 8 August 2024 at the age of 80 due to age-related illness.

== See also ==
- List of Sri Lankan broadcasters
