= Ian Huntington =

Australian cricketer (1931–2024)

Personal information
- Full name: Ian Ross Huntington
- Born: 18 October 1931; Melbourne, Victoria, Australia
- Died: 8 August 2024 (aged 92); Melbourne, Victoria, Australia
- Batting: Left-handed
- Bowling: Right-arm medium-pace
- Role: All-rounder, occasional wicket-keeper

Domestic team information
- Years: Team
- 1953/54–1963/64: Victoria

Career statistics
Competition	First-class
Matches	46
Runs scored	2,233
Batting average	34.35
100s/50s	5/9
Top score	164
Balls bowled	1,393
Wickets	16
Bowling average	41.93
5 wickets in innings	0
10 wickets in match	0
Best bowling	4/33
Catches/stumpings	35/1
- Source: Cricinfo, 21 August 2024

Ian Ross Huntington OAM (18 October 1931 – 8 August 2024) was an Australian cricketer.

Huntington played 46 first-class cricket matches for Victoria between 1953 and 1964. He hit five first-class centuries, of which the highest was 164 in January 1964 when he opened the innings against New South Wales and also scored 61 in the second innings. He was a long-time player and coach for the Melbourne Cricket Club, and also played for the club's baseball, tennis and hockey teams.

Huntington was awarded the Medal of the Order of Australia in the 1991 Australia Day Honours List for service to junior cricket administration. He died in Melbourne on 8 August 2024, at the age of 92.
