= Gu Angran =

Chinese politician (1931–2024)

Gu Angran (January 1931 – August 25, 2024, Chinese: 顾昂然), a native of Wuxi, Jiangsu Province, is a Chinese politician.

== Biography ==
Gu Angran joined the Chinese Communist Party in March 1946 and engaged in revolutionary activities. From March 1946, he held positions as a transportation officer for the Beiping School Committee of the Chengong Department of the Jinchahi Central Bureau and as a member of the underground party branch at Chongde Middle School in Beiping. Beginning in January 1949, he served as a member of the Southwest District Committee of the Beijing Municipal Committee of the Youth and the Publicity Department of the Beijing Municipal Committee of the Communist Youth League, among other roles.

From October 1950 until June 1966, he held the position of secretary in the office of Peng Zhen at the Beijing Municipal Committee, served as a cadre in the Legal Office of the General Office of the Standing Committee of the National People's Congress, and acted as a secretary in the office of Wu Xinyu. Beginning in November 1975, he held the position of cadre and director of the Department of Education for Workers and Peasants within the Ministry of Education. From March 1979 to March 1985, he was a member of the Legislative Affairs Commission of the Standing Committee of the National People's Congress, serving as director of the Research Office, director of the Civil Law Office, deputy director and secretary-general, as well as a member of the Party Group of the Standing Committee of the NPC. He held the position of Deputy Director of the Legal Affairs Commission of the Standing Committee of the National People's Congress from March 1985 to March 1985, and subsequently served as Director of the same commission from June 1993 to March 2003, retiring in December 2003.

Gu Angran served as a delegate to the 14th National Congress of the Chinese Communist Party, was a member of the Standing Committee of the Ninth National People's Congress, and held the position of Vice Chairman of the Legal Committee.

He died on August 25, 2024 at the age of 94 in Beijing.
