= Evgeny Panov =

Soviet and Russian zoologist and ethologist (1936–2024)

- Born: Moscow
- Died: August 5, 2024
- Education: Doktor of Biology Sciences
- Alma mater: MSU Faculty of Biology
- Occupation: Ethologist, university teacher, ornithologist, anthropologist
- Employer: Severtsov Institute of Ecology and Evolution
- Parent(s): Nikolay Panov
- Website: panov-ethology.ru

Evgeny (Evgeniy) Nikolayevich Panov (Russian: Евгений Николаевич Панов; 1936, in Moscow – 5 August 2024) was a Soviet and Russian zoologist and ethologist, Doctor of Biological Sciences, Professor. Laureate of the State Prize of the Russian Federation (1993). Fellow of the Russian Academy of Natural Sciences.

== Career ==
He graduated from the Department of Vertebrate Zoology at the faculty of biology of the Lomonosov Moscow State University in 1959 (he was a student of Georgi Petrovich Dementiev). Then he worked in the Kedrovaya Pad Nature Reserve. In 1966, he defended his Candidat thesis.

He returned to Moscow in 1971. In 1973, he published his first book, «Птицы Южного Приморья».

He published in Znanie – Sila.
