= Laurie Jarman =

Australian rules footballer

Personal information
- Full name: Lawrence Ross Jarman
- Born: 7 August 1935
- Died: 13 August 2024 (aged 89); Coffs Harbour, New South Wales
- Original team: Kodak
- Height: 183 cm (6 ft 0 in)
- Weight: 73 kg (161 lb)

Playing career^{1}
Years	Club	Games (Goals)
1955	Fitzroy	2 (2)
- ^{1} Playing statistics correct to the end of 1955.

Lawrence Ross Jarman (7 August 1935 – 13 August 2024) was an Australian rules footballer who played with Fitzroy in the Victorian Football League (VFL).
