= Marcel Tessier =

- Born: January 29, 1934; Montreal, Quebec, Canada
- Died: August 26, 2024 (aged 90); Saint-Jérôme, Quebec, Canada
- Occupations: Historian, opera singer, professor, writer

Marcel Tessier (29 January 1934 – 26 August 2024) was a Canadian historian, opera singer, professor, and writer from Quebec.

== Biography ==
Marcel Tessier was an activist for the Rassemblement pour l'Indépendance Nationale, a left wing political organization that supported the Quebec sovereignty movement. Tessier held a master's degree in history from the University of Montreal and was a professor at Collège Notre-Dame du Sacré-Cœur in Montreal. He taught history for 30 years. He studied stage direction and dramatic arts under Irving Guttman for two years.

Tessier was a baritone opera singer. He was instructed in opera under the tutelage of Albert Cornelier, master of the Opera-Comique in Paris.

He was married with four children.

== Awards ==
In 2001, Tessier was named Patriot of the Year by the Saint-Jean-Baptiste Society of Montreal (Société Saint-Jean-Baptiste). In 2015, Tessier received the RPS Chevalier-de-Lorimier Award from the Rassemblement pour un Pays Souverain.

== Filmography ==
=== Television ===
Year	Title	Role	Notes
1999	2000 ans des bogues	Self - historien	
2002	Le Mec à Dames	Self - chroniquer	
2009	J'ai la mémoire qui tourne	Self	
2010	Rencontres Paranormales	Self - historien	

== Publications ==
- Marcel Tessier raconte... (2000)
- Marcel Tessier raconte..., tome 2 – nouvelle édition (2004)
- Marcel Tessier raconte..., tome 1 – nouvelle édition (2004)
- Coffret : Marcel Tessier raconte, tomes 1 et 2 (2004)
- Je me souviens (2006)
- Marcel Tessier raconte notre histoire (2012)
