= Miquel Caminal i Cerdà =

Spanish politician (1952 or 1953 – 2024)

Member of the Senate for Lleida
- In office 2019–2023
- Succeeded by: Jan Pomés López

Personal details
- Born: 1952 or 1953
- Died: 17 August 2024 (aged 71)
- Party: Republican Left of Catalonia–Sovereigntists

Miquel Caminal i Cerdà (1952 or 1953 – 17 August 2024) was a Spanish Catalan politician and businessman, who served in the Senate of Spain from 2019 until 2023 for the Lleida constituency as a member of the Republican Left of Catalonia–Sovereigntists alliance. He was also a councilor in his hometown of Ribera d'Urgellet, Alt Urgell, for eight years.

Caminal stood as a candidate for mayor of La Seu d'Urgell in 2011. He was a founding member of the Cadí Hockey Club and the Sedis Aeromodelismo, as well as a promoter of Nordic skiing in the Pyrenees.

Caminal i Cerdà died on 17 August 2024, at the age of 71.
