= Park Ji-weon =

South Korean politician (1934–2024)

- 박지원

Member of the 1st National Council
- In office 23 December 1972 – 30 June 1978

Member of the 2nd National Council
- In office 6 July 1978 – 27 October 1980

Member of the 13th National Assembly
- In office 30 May 1988 – 29 May 1992
- Constituency: Hwaseong

Personal details
- Born: 11 July 1934 Suwon, Keiki Province, Korea, Empire of Japan
- Died: 17 August 2024 (aged 90)
- Party: Democratic Justice Party → Independent

Korean name
- Hangul: 박지원
- Hanja: 朴志遠
- RR: Bak Jiwon
- MR: Pak Chiwŏn

Park Ji-weon (Korean: 박지원; 11 July 1934 – 17 August 2024) was a South Korean politician who was elected as a member of 13th National Assembly from the Democratic Justice Party. Park died on 17 August 2024, at the age of 90.
