= Philip Fussell =

English shooter and cricketer (1931–2024)

Personal information
- Full name: Philip Hillier Fussell
- Born: 12 February 1931; Rode, Bath, Somerset, England
- Died: 2 August 2024 (aged 93)
- Batting: Right-handed
- Bowling: Right-arm medium pace

Domestic team information
- Years: Team
- 1953–1956: Somerset

Career statistics
Competition	FC
Matches	2
Runs scored	10
Batting average	2.50
100s/50s	0/0
Top score	5
Balls bowled	132
Wickets	1
Bowling average	71.00
5 wickets in innings	0
10 wickets in match	0
Best bowling	1/26
Catches/stumpings	1/–
- Source: CricketArchive, 22 December 2015

Philip Hillier Fussell (12 February 1931 – 2 August 2024) was an English shooter and cricketer.

Fussell was born at Rode, Somerset. A member of the Fussell family which had farming, and brewing interests in and around the village of Rode, Fussell was all-round sportsman who was prominent in cricket, shooting, where he was a champion at clay pigeon shooting, and salmon fishing. He was named in an article in The Field in 2009 as one the 100 "best shots" of all time. It said: "Clay and game are one and the same for this experienced and beautifully consistent shot, though pigeon is his speciality."

Fussell played first-class cricket for Somerset in two matches, one in each of the 1953 and 1956 seasons. He was a right-handed batsman and right-arm medium-paced bowler. He also played for Lansdown and Frome cricket clubs.

Fussell was a dairy and arable farmer and businessperson, owning a pub and steak restaurant in Rode for 30 years with his wife Jane, whom he married in 1965. He died in August 2024, aged 93.
