= Marc Pilisuk =

American scholar (1934–2024)

Marc Pilisuk (January 19, 1934 – August 20, 2024) was an American scholar of peace and conflict studies and Professor Emeritus of the University of California system, having taught at UC-Davis and UC-Berkeley. Following his retirement as a professor emeritus from the University of California, he taught and supervised graduate students at Saybrook University for over 30 years. Pilisuk is the author or coauthor of 11 books, including Hidden Structure of Violence: Who Benefits from Global Violence and War, The Triple Revolution, Poor Americans: How the White Poor Live, The Healing Web: Social Networks and Human Survival, International Conflict and Social Policy, and the three-volume anthology, Peace Movements Worldwide. He has also authored or coauthored over one hundred academic journal articles.

In 1961, Pilisuk earned a Ph.D. from the University of Michigan in clinical and social psychology. Pilisuk was a founder of the Psychologists for Social Responsibility in the early 1980s, and was president of The Society for Study of Peace, Conflict and Violence (Division 48 of the American Psychological Association).

In 2006 Pilisuk was awarded the Psychologists for Social Responsibility's annual Anthony J. Marsella Prize for Peace and Social Justice in honor of his work. In 2012, he was awarded The Howard Zinn Lifetime Achievement Award from the Peace and Justice Studies Association. In 2019, Pilisuk was awarded the Lifetime Achievement Award from the California Psychological Association.

The Dr. Marc Pilisuk Transformative Social Change Award was created at Saybrook University in 2022 to honor his life and work advancing peace and social justice. On March 30, 2024, Pilisuk received a Heritage Award for his "distinguished lifetime contributions to humanistic psychology" from the American Psychological Association's (APA) Division of Humanistic Psychology.

Pilisuk died on August 20, 2024, at the age of 90.
