= Walter Orthmann =

Brazilian record holder for longest career at a company

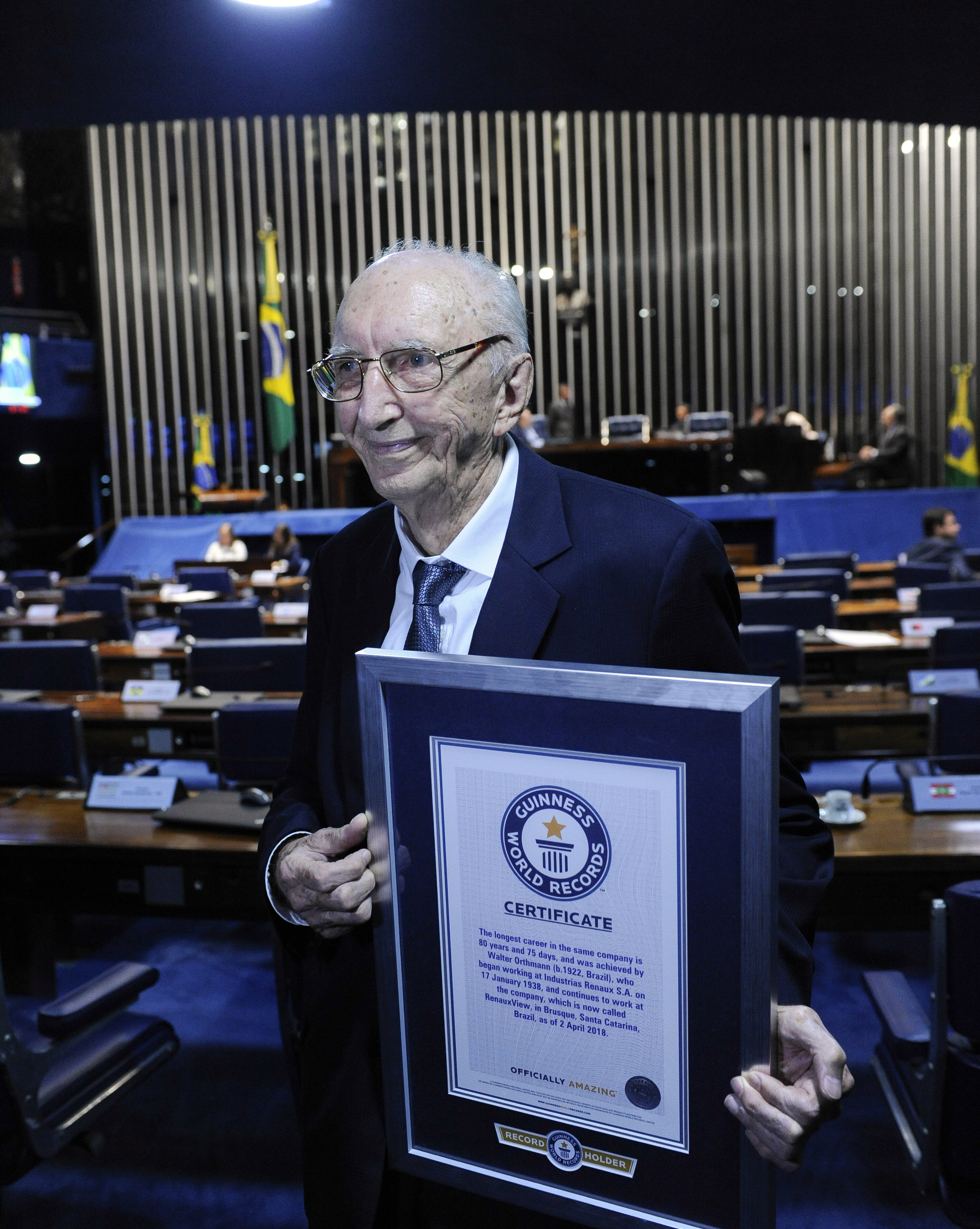
- Orthmann in 2018
- Born: 19 April 1922; Santa Catarina, Brazil
- Died: 2 August 2024 (aged 102)
- Occupation: Sales manager at textile company
- Years active: 1938–2024
- Known for: Working at the same company for over 80 years

Walter Orthmann (19 April 1922 – 2 August 2024) was a Brazilian centenarian who held the Guinness World Record for the longest career at a single company.

He began working for the textile company ReneauxView in Brusque, Santa Catarina as a shipping assistant in 1938 and continued to work for the company until at least 2022.

== Background ==
Born on 19 April 1922, Orthmann was of German descent and was born in a Brazilian town with a large German population. He was described as an excellent student, but dropped out of school to provide financial assistance to his family. On 17 January 1938, he was hired as a packing assistant at the age of 15. In 2020, in an interview with NSC TV, Orthmann said that he remembered the first calculator he used, a few years after he was hired. On 2 May 2018, he was received by Brazilian President Michel Temer, at the Palácio do Planalto. On 14 August 2018, he was honored in Brasília during a ceremony at the Superior Labor Court (TST) and received the Order of Merit for Labor Justice. Orthmann died of natural causes at home on 2 August 2024, at the age of 102.

== See also ==
- List of centenarians (businesspeople)
