= Pierre Tiollais =

French medical doctor (1934–2024)

Pierre Jean René Noël Tiollais (8 December 1934 – 5 August 2024) was a French medical doctor and biologist.

== Life and career ==
Tiollais was born in Rennes on 8 December 1934. He was a member of the French Academy of sciences of the Institute Pasteur and the French Academy of Medicine.

In 1979, in collaboration with Francis Galibert, he carried out the complete sequencing of the hepatitis B virus genome, which made it possible to manufacture the first detection tests and screening for this disease.

In 1985, with his collaborators at the Institute Pasteur, he created a vaccine obtained by genetic engineering (recombinant vaccine) against hepatitis B, prepared on Chinese hamster ovary cells (CHO) . His team were the first to create the hepatitis B vaccine using CHO cells. In 1990, he received the research prize from the Allianz-Institut de France Foundation.

Tiollais died on 5 August 2024, at the age of 89.
