= Tiny Chidi =

South African politician (died 2024)

Member of the Limpopo Provincial Legislature
- In office 14 June 2024 – 7 August 2024

Personal details
- Died: 7 August 2024
- Party: Democratic Alliance

Tiny Doraine Ramathabatha Chidi (died 7 August 2024) was a South African politician who served as a member of the Limpopo Provincial Legislature from June 2024 until her death in August 2024, representing the Democratic Alliance.

== Political career ==
A member of the Democratic Alliance, Chidi was elected a councillor of the Polokwane Local Municipality in 2016. In January 2018, she was shot in the leg and hit on the head with a firearm during an attempted hijacking at her home in Polokwane.

Chidi became a DA member of the Limpopo Provincial Legislature following 2024 national and provincial elections. She was then appointed head of the party's Mopani constituency.

== Death ==
Chidi died following a short illness on 7 August 2024. She was survived by her husband and family.
