= Alison Laurie =

New Zealand lesbian activist (1941–2024)

Alison J. Laurie
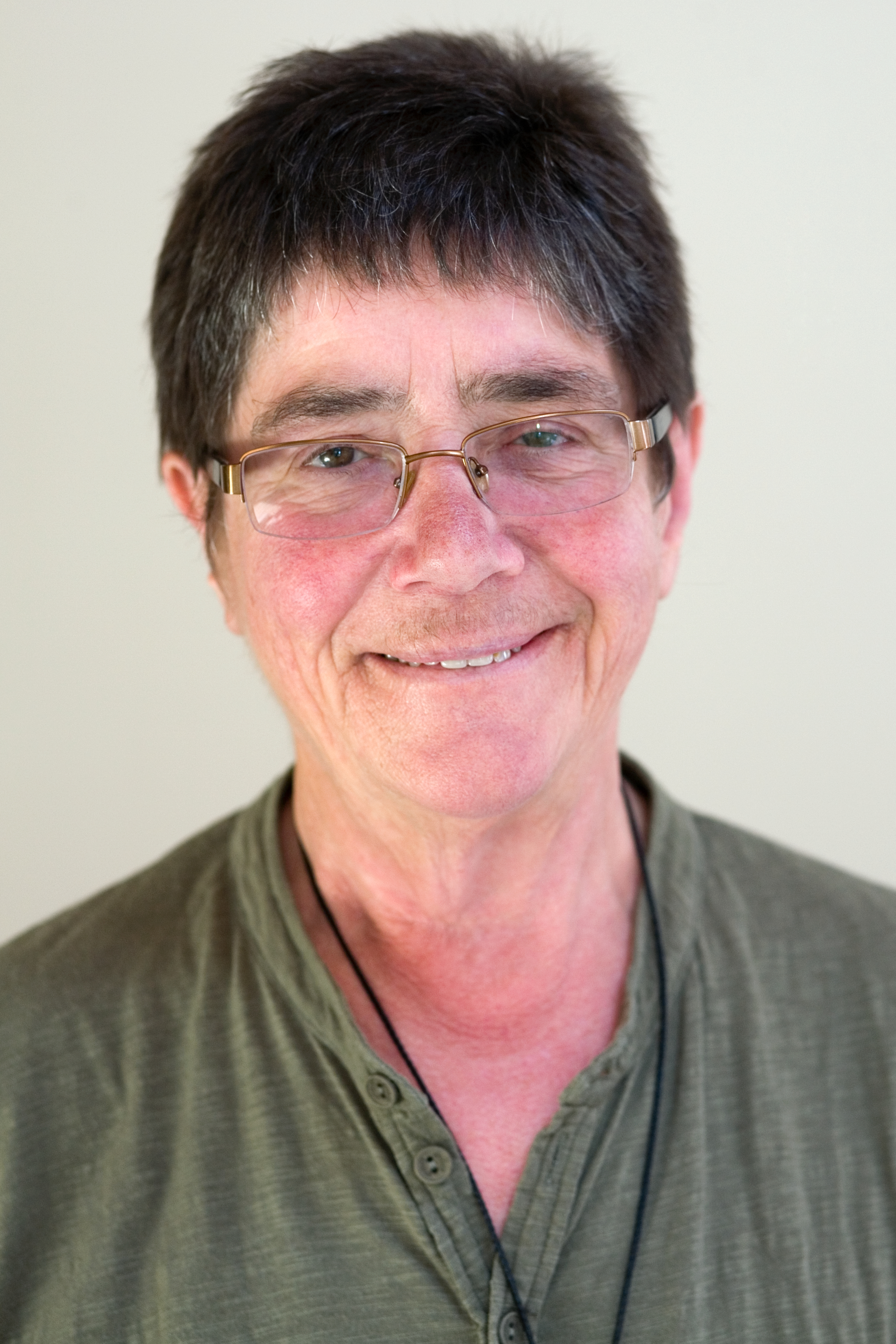
- Born: 20 April 1941; Island Bay, Wellington, New Zealand
- Died: 16 August 2024 (aged 83); Copenhagen, Denmark
- Occupations: Academic; Oral historian; Activist

Alison Jean Laurie (20 April 1941 - 16 August 2024) was a New Zealand academic, lesbian activist, and oral historian.

== Life ==
Born in Island Bay, Wellington. Laurie was of Ngāi Tahu, English, and Scottish descent.

== SHE ==
Laurie helped fund SHE - Sisters for Homophile Equality in 1973, the first lesbian equality group in New Zealand, so named as many newspapers refused to publish articles which used the term "lesbian".

In 1973, SHE published Circle, New Zealand's first lesbian magazine. Laurie was involved, and wrote the first editorial.

SHE would organise and host the first New Zealand national Lesbian Conference in 1974.

== Club 41 ==
In 1974, Laurie and other lesbian activists opened Club 41 - Wellington's first lesbian bar. It was opened on 41 Vivian Street, which had originally been The Peacock lounge, owned by Carmen Rupe.

Due to the strict alcohol licencing system of the time, Club 41 sold liquor illegally. Laurie explains "You did it through a ticket system, [that] was how people did it then. So people would buy the tickets and they'd exchange the tickets for the alcohol, so they're not directly buying the alcohol."

== Academic career ==
In 1982, Laurie became the Director of Gender and Women's studies at Victoria University of Wellington. In 1990 she began teaching a Lesbian Studies course, the first in New Zealand.

She published several articles, books, and anthologies on lesbian history and studies, being one of the first to do so in New Zealand. Her work has been described as being "actively involved in working for the safety and sanity of lesbians in Aotearoa over the years, and [has] strong teaching and/or research credentials."

== Legacy ==
Laurie acted as a trustee for Kawe Mahara, New Zealand's Queer Archives, where she helped run oral history training workshops.

In 2001, Laurie and fellow activist Bea Arthur founded the Armstrong and Arthur Charitable Trust for Lesbians. This trust helped fund other lesbian organisations such as the Reel Queer Film Festival, LILAC (the Lesbian Information, Library and Archives Centre), and the Wellington Lesbian Community Radio.
