= Matthew Ngosa =

Zambian gospel singer (1978 - 2024)

- Born: 14 February 1978; Lusaka, Zambia
- Died: 2 August 2024 (aged 46); Lusaka, Zambia
- Occupations: Singer; Songwriter
- Notable work: "Umutima Wandi"; "Lesa Wandi"
- Spouse: Tasila Ng'ombe (m. 2008)
- Children: 2
- Parent: Samaria Maswela (mother)
- Relatives: B.J Ngosa (brother); Hezron Ngosa (brother)
- Musical career
- Genres: Gospel
- Instrument: Vocals
- Years active: 1992 – 2024
- Formerly of: Ezma Brothers

Matthews Ngosa (February 14, 1978 – August 2, 2024) was a Zambian gospel singer and songwriter.

== Career ==
Ngosa rose to fame in 2004, when he released his debut album "Umutima Wandi". The single, " Umutima Wandi" eventually became his signature song.

== Death ==
On August 2, 2024, Ngosa died of liver cancer which he had been battling for years.

== Discography ==
Matthew Ngosa discography
- Studio albums: 1
- Singles: 25
- Music videos: 16

=== Studio albums ===
List of studio albums with selected details
Title	Details
Umutima Wandi	Released: 2004; Formats: CD

=== Singles ===
As lead artist

List of singles as lead artist
Title	Year	Album
"Ukulolela"	1993	—N/a
"Umutima Wandi"	2004	Umutima Wandi
"Lesa Wandi" (featuring B.J Ngosa and Peter Kabamba )	2004	Umutima Wandi
"Shakapanga"	2004	Umutima Wandi
"Ndakunkula"	2004	Umutima Wandi
"Tulemitotela"	2004	Umutima Wandi
