= Blanca Flor Bonilla =

Salvadoran politician (1951 or 1952 – 2024)

Blanca Flor Bonilla (1951 or 1952 – 17 August 2024) was a Salvadoran politician who was a member of the Farabundo Martí National Liberation Front (FMLN). She served as the deputy in the Legislative Assembly of El Salvador from 2000 until 2009. Bonilla was then elected Mayor of Ayutuxtepeque from 2009 to 2012. She also served in the Central American Parliament (PARLACEN).

Bonilla was a member of the Farabundo Martí Popular Liberation Forces during the Salvadoran Civil War.

Bonilla died on 17 August 2024, at the age of 72.
