= Bălceana =

- Village
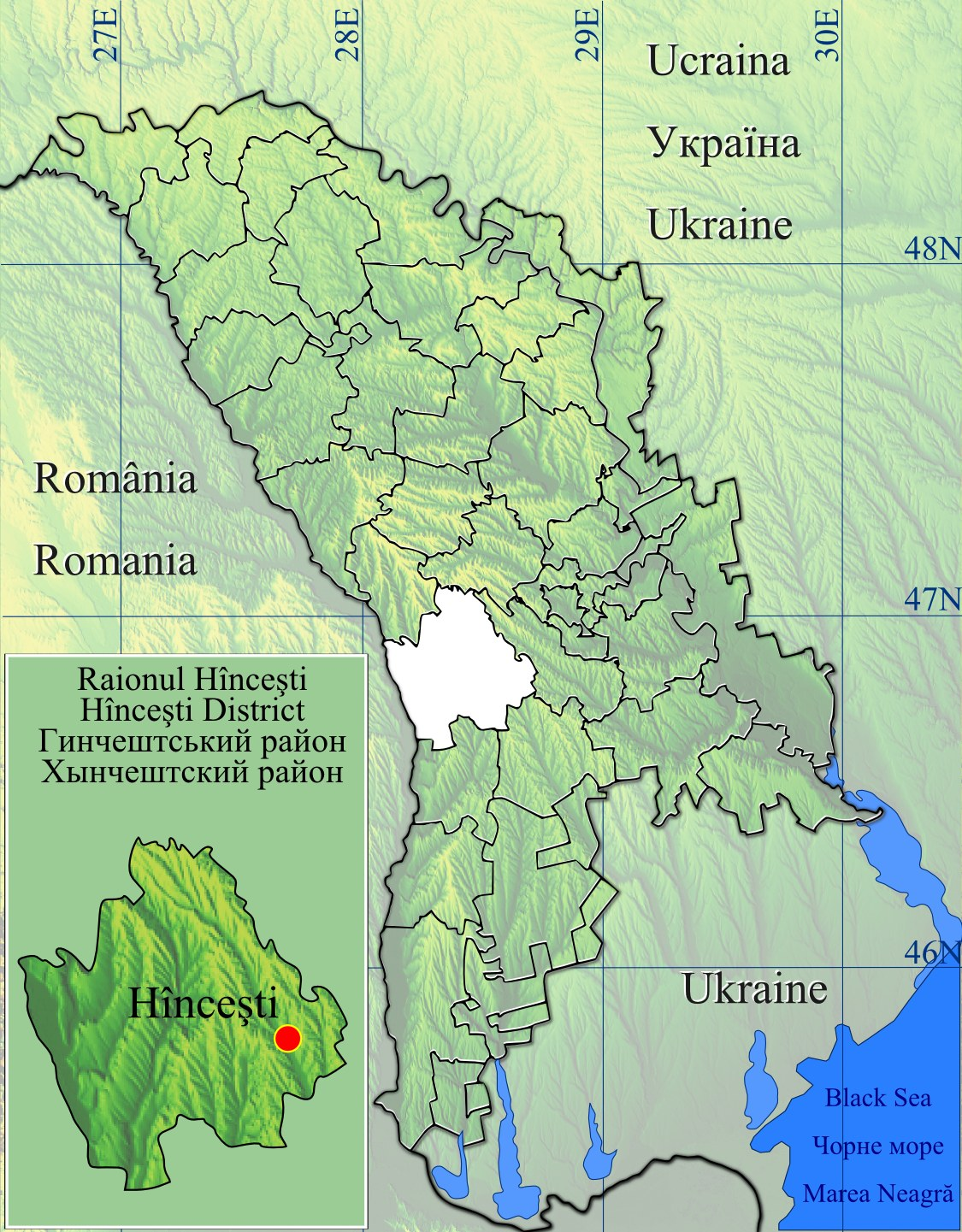
- Location within Hîncești
- Coordinates: 46°50′56″N 28°24′21″E
- Country: Moldova

Government
  - Mayor: Valentin Chiorescu (PDM)

Population (2014 census)
  - Total: 1,597
- Time zone: UTC+2 (EET)
  - Summer (DST): UTC+3 (EEST)
- Postal code: MD-3412

Bălceana is a village in Hîncești District, Moldova.
