= Renato Ricci (Australian footballer) =

Australian rules footballer (1940–2024)

Personal information
- Full name: Renato Luciano Peter Ricci
- Born: 1 February 1940
- Died: 27 August 2024 (aged 84)
- Original team: Richmond YCW
- Height: 173 cm (5 ft 8 in)
- Weight: 64 kg (141 lb)

Playing career^{1}
Years	Club	Games (Goals)
1960	Richmond	2 (0)
1961-64	Oakleigh (VFA)	
- ^{1} Playing statistics correct to the end of 1960.

Renato Luciano Peter Ricci (1 February 1940 – 27 August 2024) was an Australian rules footballer who played with Richmond in the Victorian Football League (VFL).

Ricci was a rover who played in the Richmond Under 19 Premiership team in 1958 with his identical twin brother, Lidio Ricci. After missing the entire 1959 season due to injury, Ricci played two games with the Richmond senior team in 1960 before transferring to VFA club Oakleigh in 1961.

Ricci died on 27 August 2024, at the age of 84.
