= Armhoede =

- Hamlet
- Location in the province of Gelderland in the Netherlands Armhoede (Netherlands)
- Coordinates: 52°10′N 6°27′E
- Country: Netherlands
- Province: Gelderland
- Municipality: Lochem
- Village: Exel
- Elevation: 12.7 m (42 ft)

Population (2020)
  - Total: c. 90
- Time zone: UTC+1 (CET)
  - Summer (DST): UTC+2 (CEST)
- Postcode: 7241
- Area code: 0573

Armhoede is a hamlet in the municipality of Lochem in the province of Gelderland in the Netherlands. It is located two kilometers northeast of Lochem on the canal from Zutphen to Enschede. Administratively, it is largely part of the village of Exel.

The name Armhoede (Dutch for 'poverty') would originally have been the name of a meadow nearby, which served as a general pasture for the less wealthy cattle herders.

There is a landfill near Armhoede, which was closed in 2004 and has now been covered. A solar park has been opened on the site of the former landfill.
