= Simone Roganti =

Italian cyclist (2003–2024)

Personal information
- Born: 25 August 2003 Spoltore, Abruzzo, Italy
- Died: 30 August 2024 (aged 21) Spoltore, Abruzzo, Italy

Cycling career
- Sport: Cycling
- Discipline: Road
- Role: Rider
- Rider type: All-rounder

Amateur team
- 2020–2021: Big Hunter Beltrami Seanese

Professional teams
- 2022–2023: D'Amico–UM Tools
- 2024: MG.K Vis Colors for Peace

Simone Roganti (25 August 2003 – 30 August 2024) was an Italian professional cyclist. In July 2024, he finished in seventh position in the Giro della Valle d'Aosta, after having achieved seventh place in the first stage between Saint-Gervais and Passy and a runner-up finish in the Giro del Veneto. In 2021 he participated in the Giro della Lunigiana representing Italy.

== Cycling career ==
Roganti grew up in a cycling family in Spoltore, Italy. Both his uncles Fabrizio and Frederico were cyclists. Roganti trained at the "Nuova Spiga Aurea" cycling school, after choosing cycling over playing goalkeeper on his youth football team. He graduated from the Alessandro Volta Sports and Scientific High School in Pescara before turning professional.

In 2020 Roganti competed professionally for the first time in the Giro di Sicily. In 2021 he participated in the Giro della Lunigiana representing Italy's national cycling team, and placed 106th in the Italian National Championships Road Race.

In 2022 and 2023, Roganti cycled for D'Amico–UM Tools. He began to develop as a cyclist under the team, racing in seven races in 2022, and 24 in 2023.

In 2024, Roganti began cycling for the MG.K Vis Colors for Peace team. That year, he would race 17 times and acquire his first PCS and UCI points. He finished in twelfth place as part of the MG.K Vis team during the youth classification at Coppi e Bartali, and fifteenth in the same classification at the Giro d'Abruzzo. That same year he finished in seventh position in the 60th Giro della Valle d'Aosta, after having achieved seventh place in the first stage between Saint-Gervais and Passy and a second place in the Giro del Veneto.

On 22 August, he appeared as a guest on Luciano Rabottini's cycling show, Veló to discuss his career and upcoming races.

The 34th edition of the SC Corsanico Trophy was his last race, held on 25 August, the day he turned 21, finishing in ninth place. On 15 September he was to compete in the Trofeo Matteotti.

== Death ==
Roganti died on 30 August 2024, at the age of 21, after having suffered a heart attack at his home. It was later determined his death was caused by cardiac arrhythmia, due to a genetic defect of his heart.

In 2025, Roganti was scheduled to compete for the TDT–Unibet Cycling Team in the Netherlands.

== Major results ==
2021
3rd GP Citta di Fiesole
4th Trofeo Sportivi di Pieve al Toppo
6th Trofeo Abmol
6th Trofeo Insieme - Cotignola
7th Contrada Basciani di Alba Adriatica - Alba Adriatica
2023
9th Memoria Silvano Torresi
2024
2nd Overall Giro del Veneto Junior
5th Milano–Busseto
9th Gran Premio di Poggiana
9th Trofeo Corsanico
10th Trofeo Comune Di Capraia
10th Overall Giro della Valle d'Aosta

== See also ==
- Sonny Colbrelli, Italian cyclist who suffered cardiac arrhythmia and was forced to retire
- Joachim Halupczok, 25 year old Polish racing cyclist who died of cardiac arrhythmia due to a heart defect
- Frederiek Nolf, 21 year old Belgian professional cyclist who died of apparent heart attack in his hotel
- Gijs Verdick, 21 year old Dutch professional cyclist who died of a heart attack during the night between races
- Daan Myngheer, 22 year old Belgian professional cyclist who died of a heart attack
- List of racing cyclists and pacemakers with a cycling-related death
