= Jeroen Brouwers =

Dutch writer (1940–2022)

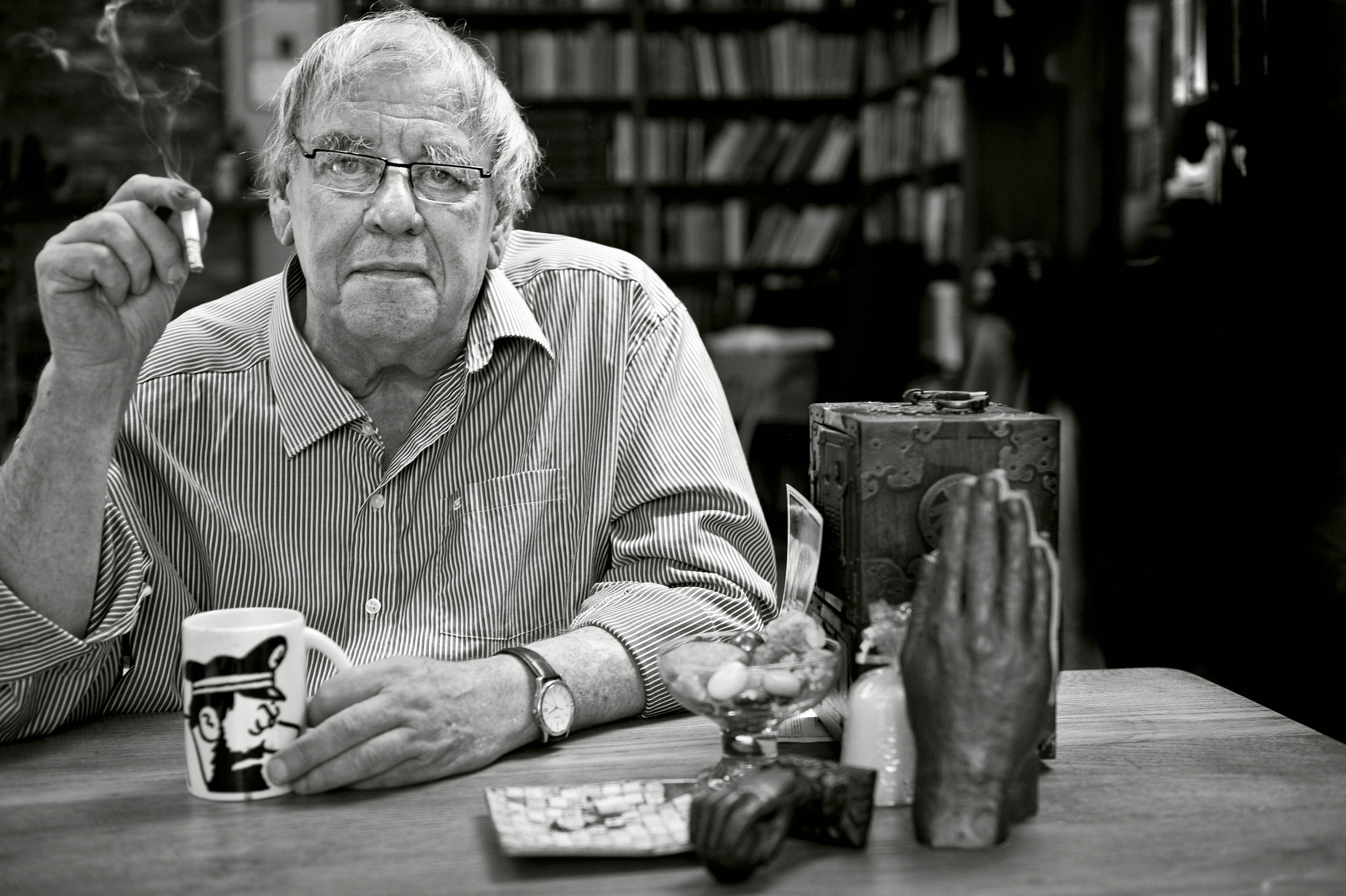
- Born: Jeroen Godfried Marie Brouwers; 30 April 1940; Batavia, Dutch East Indies
- Died: 11 May 2022 (aged 82); Maastricht, Netherlands
- Occupation: Writer

Jeroen Godfried Marie Brouwers (30 April 1940 – 11 May 2022) was a Dutch writer.

From 1964 to 1976 Brouwers worked as an editor at Manteau publishers in Brussels. In 1964 he made his literary debut with Het mes op de keel (The Knife to the Throat).

He won the Ferdinand Bordewijk Prijs in 1989 for De zondvloed, the Constantijn Huygens Prize in 1993 for his collected works, and in 1995 the Prix Femina étranger for International works for his book Bezonken rood (Sunken Red). In 2007 he refused the Dutch Literature Prize (Prijs der Nederlandse Letteren) - the highest literary accolade in the Dutch-speaking world - because he considered the prize money of €16,000 too low for all his work.

Brouwers received the Libris Prize for Cliënt E. Busken in 2021.

== Life ==
Jeroen Brouwers was born on 30 April 1940 in Batavia, the capital of the former Dutch East Indies (now Jakarta, Indonesia). He was the fourth child of Jacques Theodorus Maria Brouwers (1903–1964), an accountant in a firm of architects, and Henriëtte Elisabeth Maria van Maaren (1908–1981), daughter of the musician Leo van Maaren (1885–1945).

After the Japanese invasion of Java in 1942 and KNIL's capitulation, his father was sent to a POW camp near Tokyo, Japan. Jeroen, his grandmother (Elisabeth Henrica), his mother and his sister were sent to the Japanese detainment camp 'Kramat'. After some months they were transferred to the Tjideng camp, in a Batavia suburb. His grandparents did not survive these camps. In 1986 Jeroen wrote the autobiographical novel Bezonken Rood (translated in 1988 as Sunken Red), about the lifelong effects of this Japanese internment.

After the war his family was reunited and they moved to Balikpapan (Borneo). Jeroen's mother returned, with her children, to the Netherlands in 1947. In 1948 their father joined them. Until 1950 Jeroen lived with his parents. When he was 10 years old, he was sent to several Roman Catholic institutions. He was sent there because he was considered in need of additional psychological care. He had difficulties adjusting to the Dutch way of life after life in Indonesia. His parents moved to Delft, The Netherlands. Upon leaving secondary school in 1955, Brouwers did military service from 1958 to 1961, after which he started working as an apprentice journalist for De Gelderlander a Dutch provincial newspaper. He wrote for a military magazine entitled Salvo.

In 1962 he was hired by the Geillustreerde Pers (Illustrated Press) in Amsterdam, the Netherlands. He became an editor for the Romance magazine, which was later renamed Avenue. From 1964 to 1976 he worked for Manteau Publishers in Brussels, Belgium as assistant editor and later editor (in chief). From 1968 to 1971 he lived with his family in Vossem, Belgium and later in Huize Krekelhof in Rijmenam, Belgium. He has had three children: two sons, Daan Leonard (1965–2006) and Pepijn (1968), and a daughter Anne (1980).

After quarreling with his CEO Julien Weverbergh Brouwers resigned from Manteau and devoted himself full-time to literature. After a period in Warnsveld, Netherlands, he moved to Exel (a village in the Dutch municipality of Lochem).

In 1991 he moved to a houseboat near Uitgeest, Netherlands. In 1993 he moved again, to Zutendaal, Belgium.

Since 1992 Brouwers has been included in the Orde van de Vlaamse Leeuw (Order of the Flemish Lion) and since 1993 knight in the Belgian crown order.

In 2001 he received the Multatuli Prize.

In 2007 the Taalunie (Language Union) awarded Brouwers the Prijs der Nederlandse Letteren, a prize presented every three years to a Dutch-language author for his or her entire oeuvre. It is the only literary prize presented jointly by the Dutch and Flemish governments. He initially accepted the prize, but later refused it because he claimed the prize money of €16,000 was insultingly low.

In spring 2021, Brouwers announced he would stop writing books and considered himself to be retired.

On 11 May 2022, Brouwers' publisher announced that he had died after a brief period of illness.
