= Exel, Netherlands =

Exel
- Village
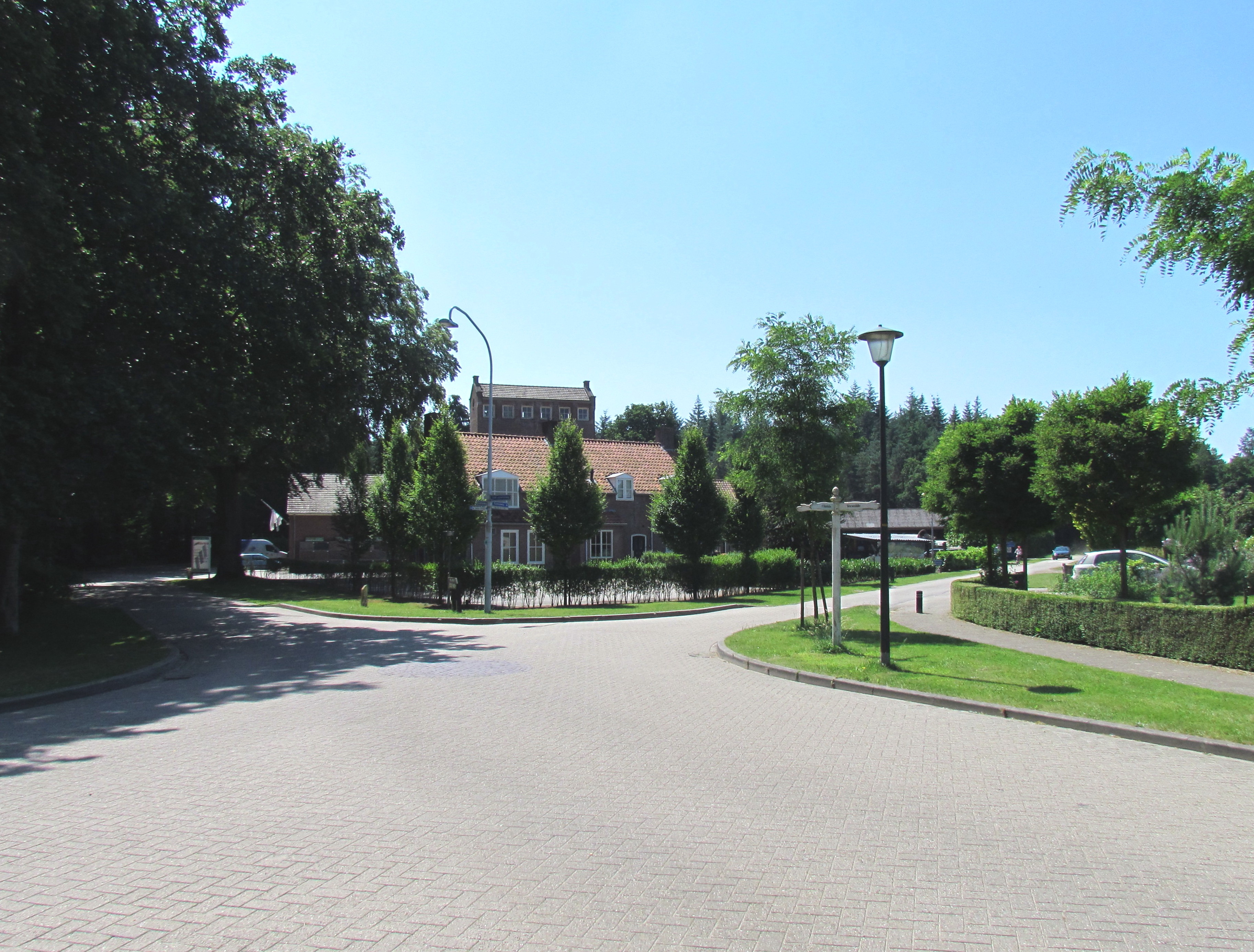
- Street view of Exel

- Location in the province of Gelderland in the Netherlands Exel (Netherlands)
- Coordinates: 52°11′N 6°25′E
- Country: Netherlands
- Province: Gelderland
- Municipality: Lochem
- Elevation: 12.5 m (41 ft)

Population (2020)
  - Village: c. 870
  - Urban: c. 170
- Time zone: UTC+1 (CET)
  - Summer (DST): UTC+2 (CEST)
- Postcode: 7245
- Area code: 0573
- Website: exelplaza.nl

Exel (Dutch pronunciation: [ˈɛksəl]) is a village in the municipality of Lochem in the province of Gelderland in the Netherlands, in an area known as the Achterhoek.

The village consists of four streets, the Oude Lochemseweg, the Exelseweg, 't Veld, and the Vossebosweg. Exel consists of a core with approximately 55 homes and 170 inhabitants and a large rural area with 700 inhabitants. The area, with a length of 6.5 km and a width of 1.5 km, is wedged between the Verwolde and Ampsen estates and borders the Ampsen forests.

== History ==
Exel, called Eghesloe in 1392, was originally a hamlet, consisting of about ten farms clustered around the Ekselse Enk. The marke Exel existed from 1616 to 1852. Exel was then part of the municipality of Laren, which was merged into the municipality of Lochem in 1971. The residents of the Ampsen estate have had a major influence on the marke of Exel. The owner of the Ampsen estate was often markerichter of Exel. For example, members of the Van Nagell family, who owned Ampsen for centuries, were richters of Exel.

== Facilities ==
Exel had a public primary school; this was closed in August 2013.

== Notable people ==
- Jeroen Brouwers (1940–2022), writer, journalist, and essayist
