= Ampsen =

- Hamlet
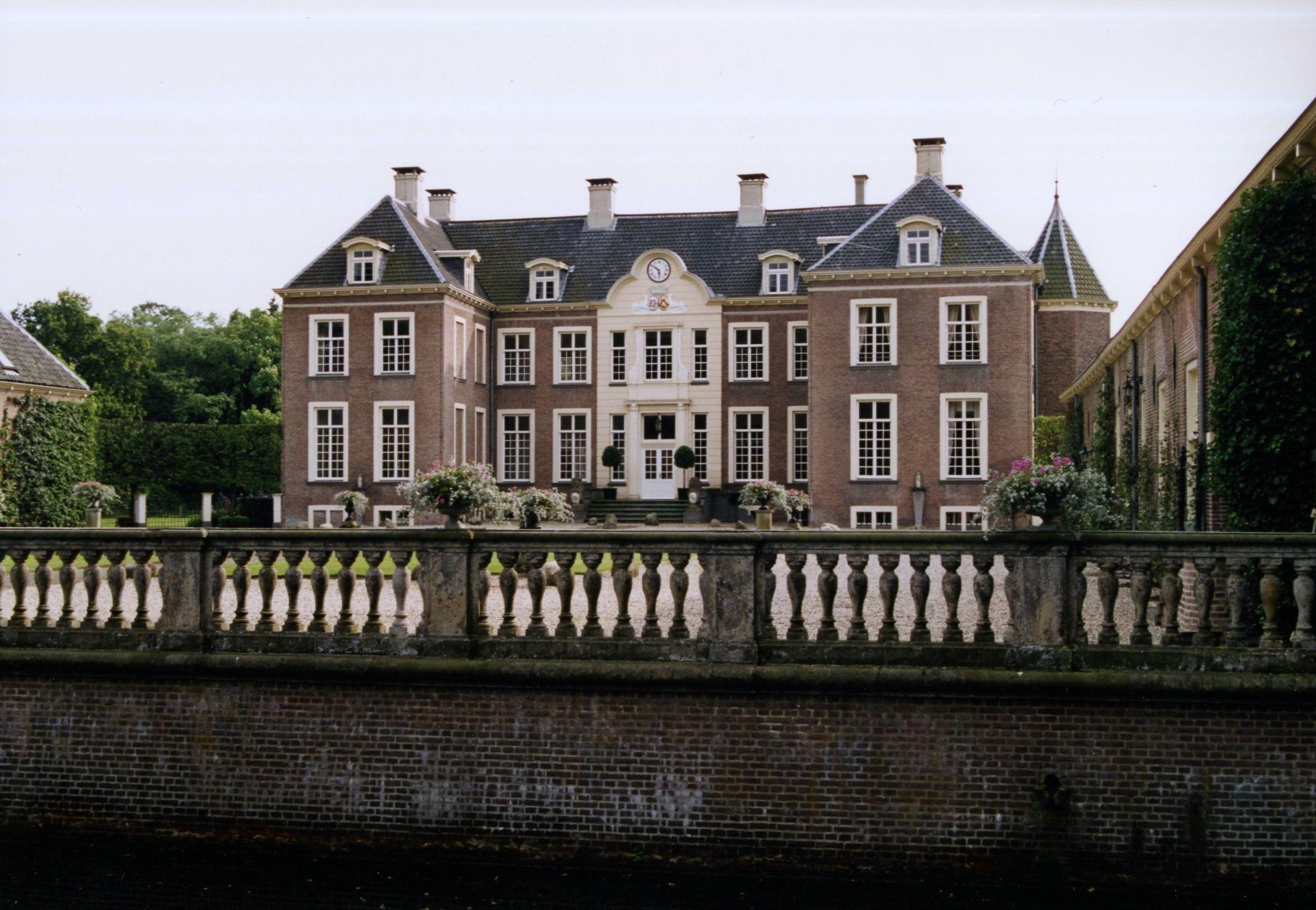
- Ampsen castle

- Location in the province of Gelderland in the Netherlands Ampsen (Netherlands)
- Coordinates: 52°10′N 6°25′E
- Country: Netherlands
- Province: Gelderland
- Municipality: Lochem
- Village: Exel
- Elevation: 12.6 m (41 ft)

Population (2020)
  - Total: c. 80
- Time zone: UTC+1 (CET)
  - Summer (DST): UTC+2 (CEST)
- Postcode: 7241
- Area code: 0573

Ampsen (Dutch pronunciation: [ˈɑmp.sə(n)]) is an estate, castle, and hamlet in the municipality of Lochem in the province of Gelderland in the Netherlands. Administratively, it is part of the village of Exel.

== History ==
In the year 1105, an 'Ulricus de Amsene' is mentioned as a witness in a spurious charter. From this mention one deduces that an Ampsen estate must have already existed at that time. There were two estates called Ampsen: Ouden-Ampsen ('Old Ampsen') and Nieuwen-Ampsen ('New Ampsen'). Ouden-Ampsen was a fief of the dukes of Guelders and has been mentioned as such in the fief registers of the Zutphen quarter since 1379. It was already a fortified house around that time because in 1389 its owner promised not to harm the Duke of Gelre and his subordinates from this house. Nieuwen-Ampsen was located next to Ouden-Ampsen and was an allodial estate until it was also made a Guelders fief in 1650. Both Ampsen houses were destroyed during the Spanish period by the Spaniards in 1605.

Gerrit Jan van Nagell had the current house built around 1650. However, it is not known whether he chose a completely new place for this, or whether he used the location of the old house.

Shortly after 1754, the house was expanded by Johan Herman Sigismund van Nagell: a new wing was added to the right of the L-shaped building, creating a U-shape. The castle moat around the house was filled in.

Today there is a farm with that name and a partly moated castle island near the spot where Oud-Ampsen once stood, but between this farm and the current castle, there is another Nieuwen-Ampsen farm. The castle and estate are still privately owned today.

== Gallery ==
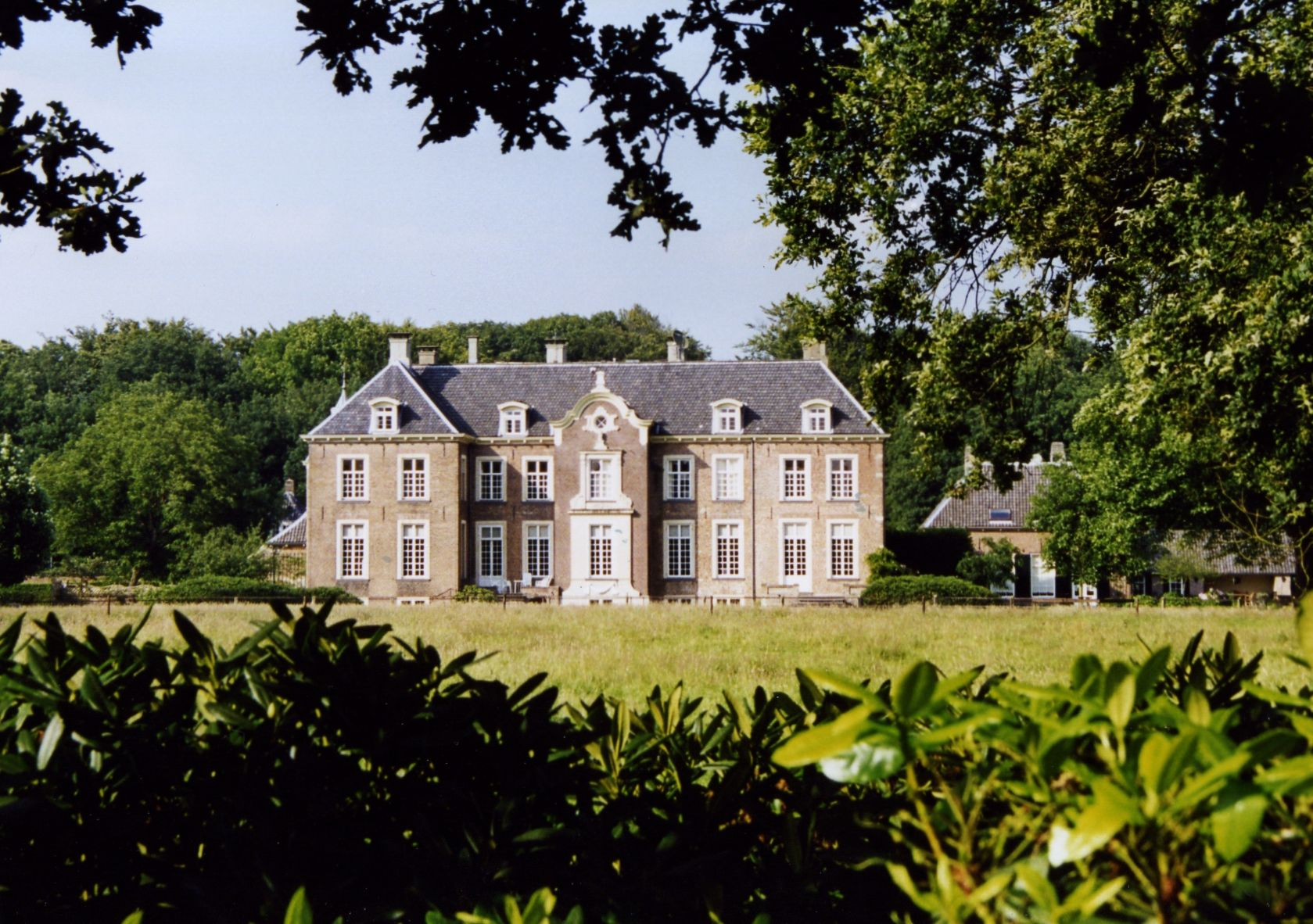
Castle from the middle of the estate

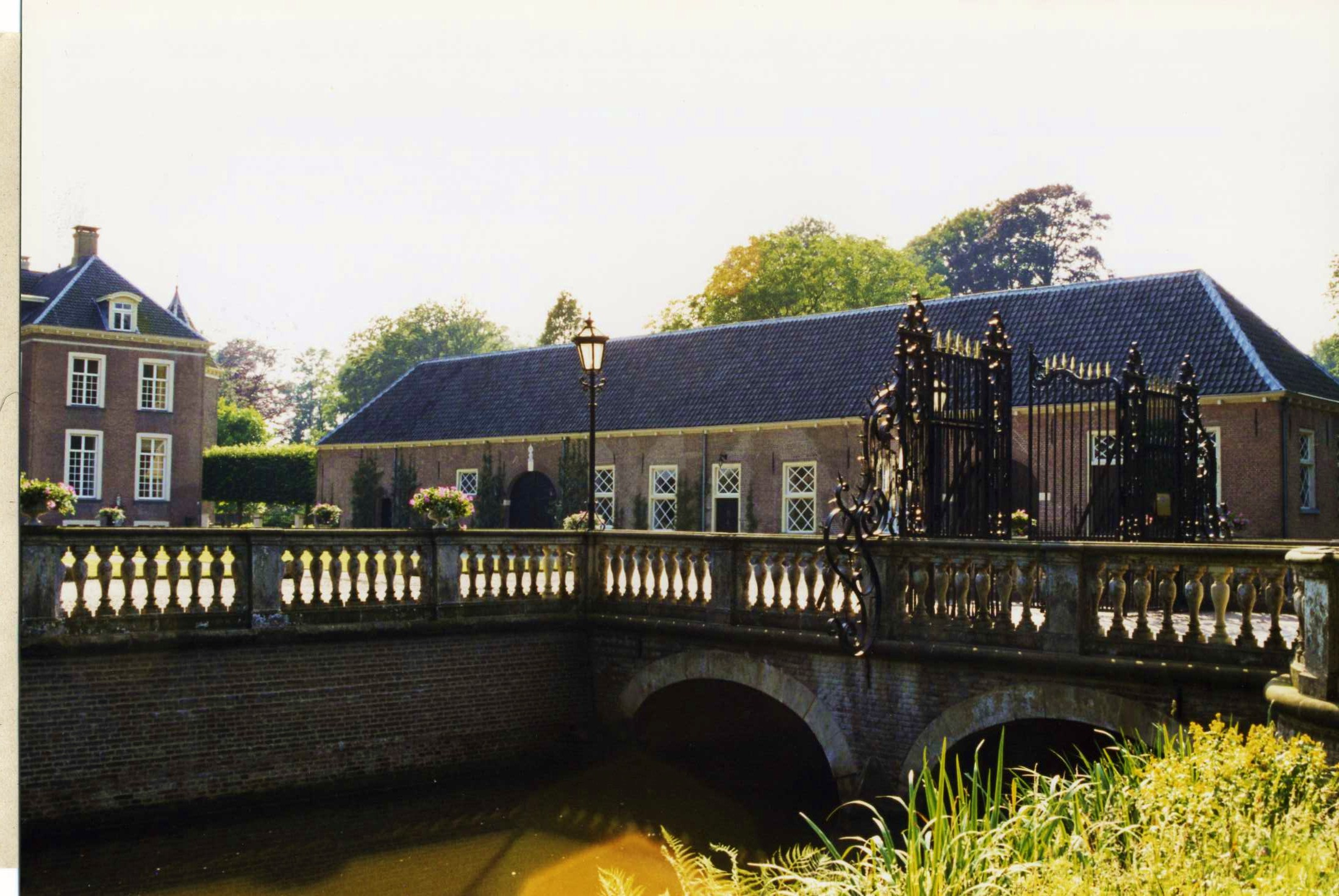
Northwestern part of the castle

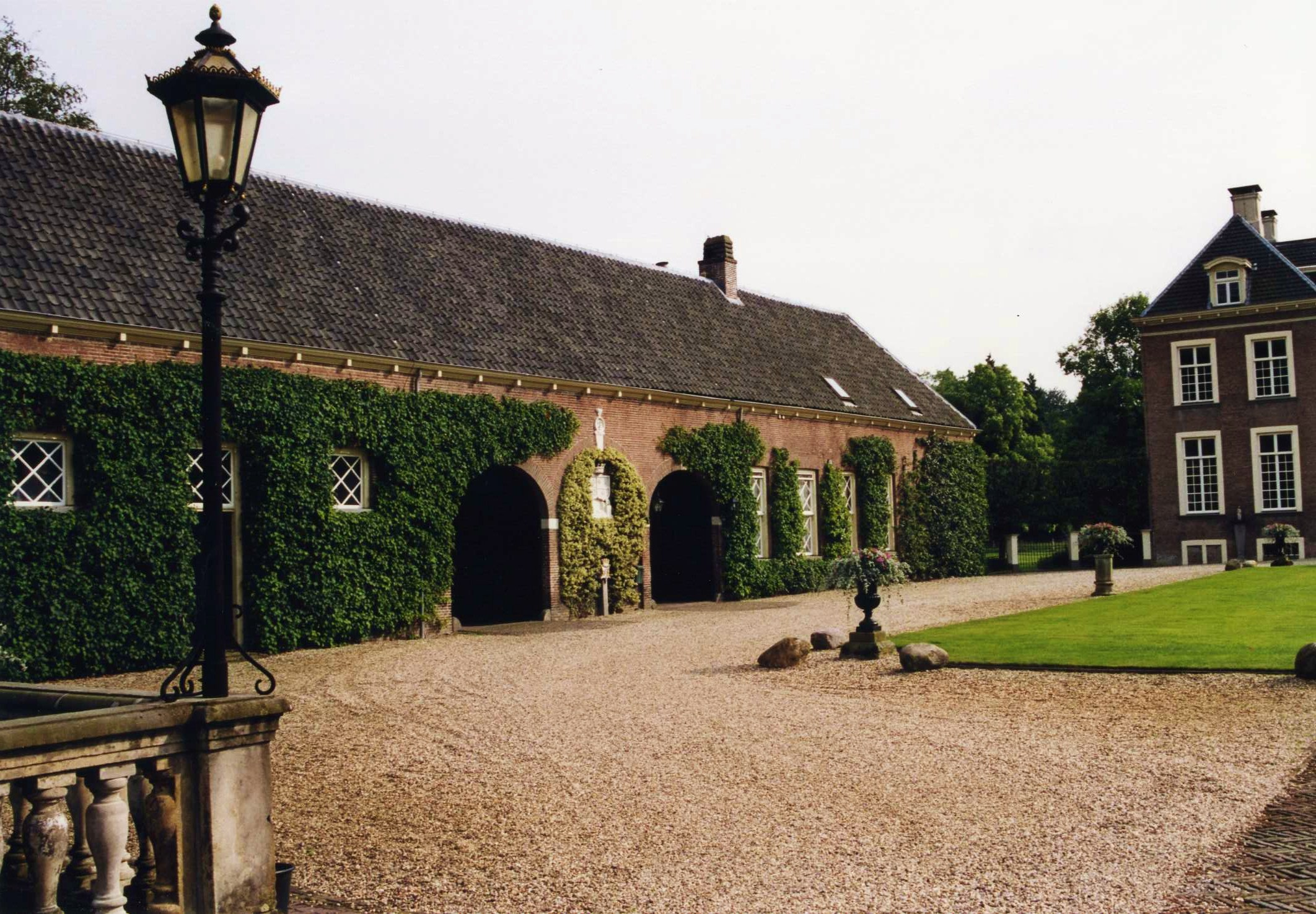
Southeastern part of the castle

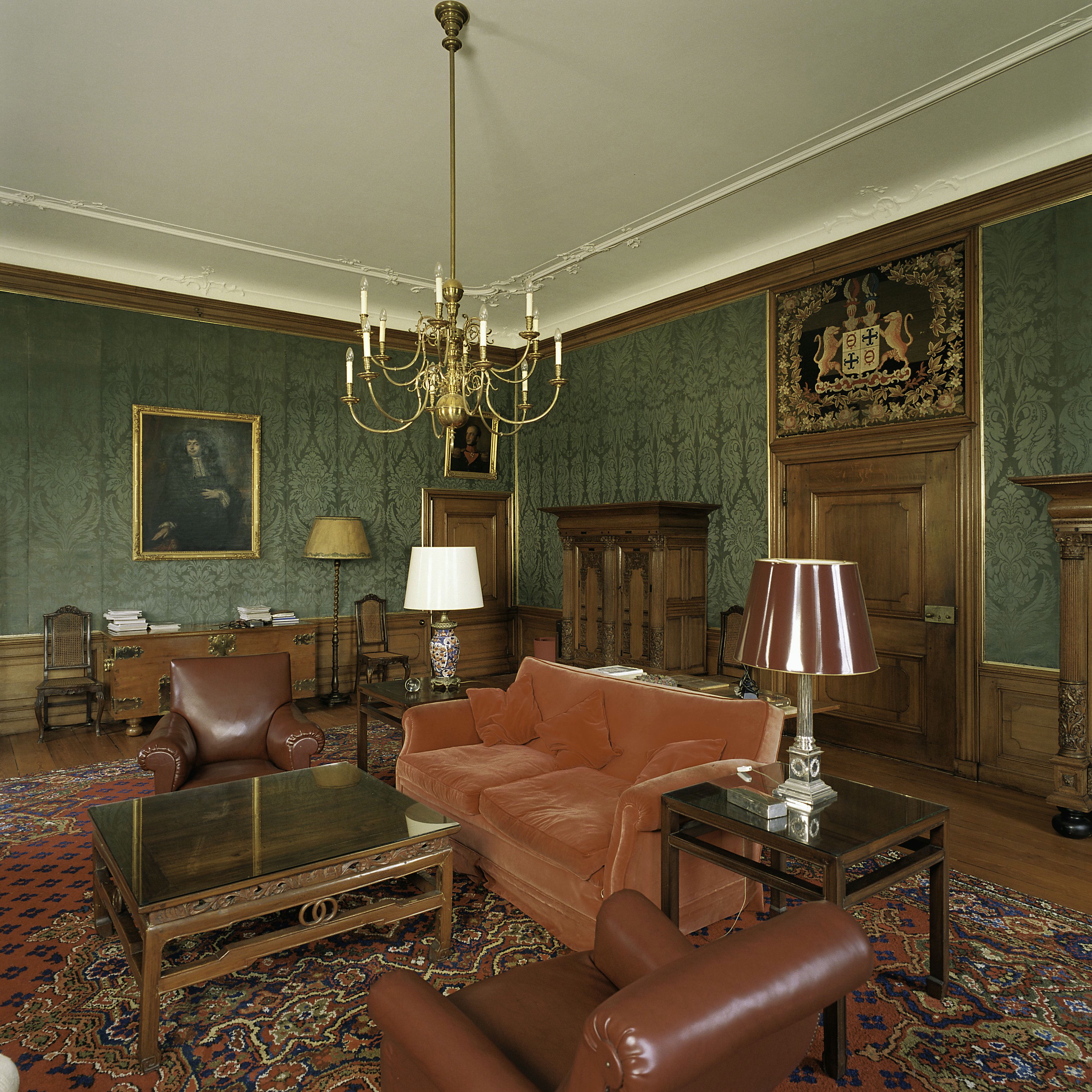
'Green Room', interior

== Bibliography ==
- Harenberg, J.; Thomassen, J. (1999). Eens bolwerk van de adel: kastelen en landhuizen in de Achterhoek en Liemers (in Dutch). Alphen aan de Rijn: Canaletto/Repro Holland. ISBN 9789064697487.
