= Dorth =

Coordinates: 52°14′N 6°17′E

Dorth (sometimes "Kring van Dorth") is a former municipality in the Dutch province of Gelderland. It existed between 1818 and 1831, when it was merged with the village of Gorssel.

The municipality covered the area around the present hamlets of Kring van Dorth and De School.
