= Carel de Villeneuve =

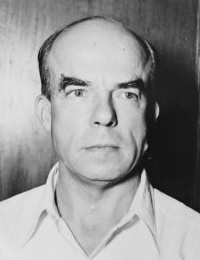
- Born: 7 July 1897; Lochem, Netherlands
- Died: 12 March 1974 (aged 76); Barcelona, Spain
- Other names: Jhr Mr Dr Carel Huibert Valchaire de Villeneuve Esq
- Occupations: Lawyer, business representative, public servant, government advisor
- Years active: 1920–1964

Carel Huibert Valchaire de Villeneuve (1897–1974) was a lawyer and director of business associations in colonial Indonesia during the 1920s–1940s, and a public servant and advisor to the Indonesian government on trade policy during the 1950s–1960s.

== Early life in the Netherlands ==
De Villeneuve was born in Lochem on 7 July 1897 as the first child of Volkert Huibert de Villeneuve (1866–1938) and Joanna Visser (1868–1953). His father was a district school inspector, but De Villeneuve grew up and attended primary school in the vicinity of Rotterdam after his father became Mayor of Alblasserdam in 1898 and later Mayor of Hillegersberg and Schiebroek. De Villeneuve attended high school at the prestigious Gymnasium Erasmianum in nearby Rotterdam. He interrupted his high school studies for a half-year extended journey through the United States. After finishing high school, De Villeneuve studied law at Leiden University, although his studies were interrupted by military service during World War I. He graduated in 1919 with a Doctorate of Law after defending propositions.

De Villeneuve married Wilhelmina Mees (1898–1984) on 3 February 1920 in Rotterdam. She was the daughter of Abraham Cornelis Mees (1864–1950) and Louise Johanna Philippina van Rijnberk (1873–1949) of Semarang (Indonesia). The couple departed for Indonesia, where De Villeneuve established himself as a lawyer and solicitor in Semarang city. The couple lived in Ciandi, an upper class suburb in the hills South of Semarang, where they had four sons: Volkert Huibert (1921–2017), Abraham Cornelis (1923), Gualtherus Hendrik (‘Henk’) (1926–1952) and Peter Josias (1930–1946).

== 1920–1934: Professional and public life in Semarang ==
In Semarang, De Villeneuve was a partner in the long-established law practice of J.S.G. Scheltema. Several stalwarts of colonial policy and colonial public service had worked at the law practice before De Villeneuve arrived: C.Th. van Deventer (a leading advocate of the 'Ethical Policy' in colonial Indonesia and later member of parliament in the Netherlands), T.B. Pleyte (later a member of parliament and later Minister for Colonial Affairs) and D. Fock (later Governor General), as well as J.H. van Hasselt and O. van Rees (both later occupied senior positions in association of owners of sugar factories in colonial Indonesia (Bond van Eigenaren van Nederlandsch-Indische Suikerondernemingen, BENISO).

From 1926, De Villeneuve was socially active as an elected member of the local council of Semarang. He was a founding President of the Semarang section of the Mountaineering Association (Vereeniging voor Bergsport) in colonial Indonesia. During 1930–1934 he was also President of the Association of Agricultural Entrepreneurs in the Principalities of Yogyakarta and Surakarta (Bond van Vorstenlandsche Landbouwondernemers, BVL), located in Semarang. In that capacity he was a member of the board of the Association of Entrepreneurs in Indonesia (Indische Ondernemersbond, IOB).

== 1934–1942: Boards of industry associations, member of parliament ==
In 1934, De Villeneuve was a candidate to succeed G.H.C. Hart as President of IOB, but the position went to G.A.P. Weijer, the manager of the Colonial Bank (Koloniale Bank) branch in Surabaya. De Villeneuve moved to the Netherlands, where he became Secretary of BENISO, a lobby group of the sugar industry in Indonesia, during 1935–1937. In December 1937, De Villeneuve was appointed President of IOB to succeed Weijer, who had taken up a chair in economics at the University of Utrecht, and he returned to Indonesia.

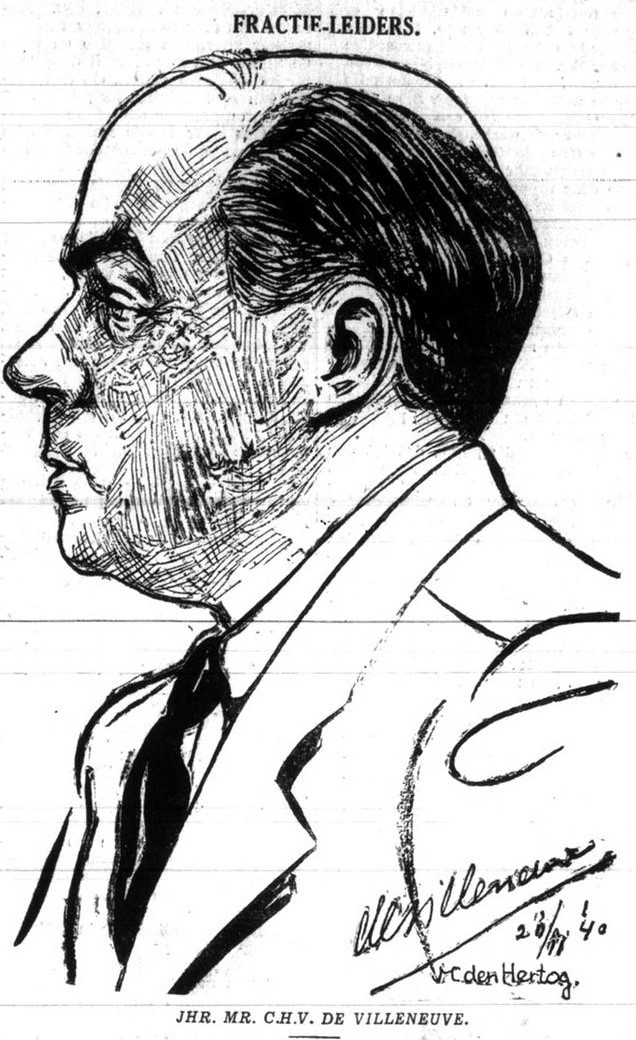
C.H.V de Villeneuve portrait, 1941

De Villeneuve held the position of IOB President and chair of the IOB board until January 1947. In this capacity, De Villeneuve was an appointed member of the parliament (Volksraad) of the Dutch East Indies during 1938–1942 and leader of the 'economic faction' of four that represented the business sector in Indonesia. During his IOB presidency, De Villeneuve was generally supportive of the economic and social development policies that the Department of Economic Affairs under the Directorships of H.J. van Mook and J.E. van Hoogstraten pursued during 1934–1942. These policies effectively implied a greater degree of economic policy autonomy for the colonial government, as well as acceptance by the private sector of government intervention in the economy in return for a sustained dialogue between government and the private sector. De Villeneuve was regarded as a good speaker in the parliament, who made his points clearly and 'with the same sprightly vivaciousness which also characterises his whole personality'.

As IOB president, De Villeneuve also assumed several other positions, including: chairman of the General Council for Trade Policy (Algemeene Bedrijfsreglementeeringsraad); deputy chair of the Commission for Legal Transactions during Wartime (Commissie voor het Rechtsverkeer in Oorlogstijd); member of the board of the Society to Combat Unemployment in Indonesia (Indische Maatschappij voor Werkloosheidsbestrijding); member of the Permanent Commission for Sea Transport (Permanente Zeevervoerscommissie); member of the advisory council of Foundation to Provide Sea and Aviation Insurance (Stichting tot Voorziening in Zee- en Luchtvaartverzekering); member of the Commission for Labour Affairs (Commissie voor Arbeidsaangelegenheden) and the Commission of Support and Advice for the Industry Council (Commissie van Bijstand en Advies van den Industrieraad).

On the eve of World War II in the Pacific, De Villeneuve attended the International Labour Organization conference in Washington DC, together with Hindromartono, the President of the Indonesian Railways Workers' Union. A brief meeting of both with US President F.D. Roosevelt served to bolster American support for Indonesia during the brief war with Japan.

== 1942–1949: Japanese occupation, supporter of Indonesia's independence ==
From February 1944 to May 1945, De Villeneuve was interned by the Japanese. He was one of the leaders the Cimahi internment camp near Bandung, where he assumed responsibility for camp management and contacts with the Japanese authorities. Soon after the Japanese surrender in August 1945, De Villeneuve returned to Jakarta to resume his position as IOB President and to rebuild the organisation.

In July 1946 De Villeneuve accepted an invitation to become one of the advisors of Lt Governor General Van Mook. In that capacity he was involved in the discussions with leaders of the Republic of Indonesia about the process towards Indonesia's independence. At the time of the negotiations in Pangkalpinang in September 1946 De Villeneuve explained that the process towards Indonesian independence caused quite some angst among the older generation of Dutch nationals in Indonesia, but praised the vision of Van Mook to work towards Indonesia's independence.

In a newspaper interview De Villeneuve stated:

‘It is a mistake to think that the opinions and beliefs of entrepreneurs in Indonesia are determined by perceptions of the crudest self-interest or of a material nature only. To the contrary. Because people in those circles are not holding on to outdated views of the Dutch East Indies-old style, they are more inclined to accept the new situation. [...] Once they transposed themselves to that new way of thinking, they perceive the new atmosphere as quite liberating.'

The conclusion of negotiations about independence in Linggajati in November 1946 established the basis for the process towards Indonesia's independence as a federal state. De Villeneuve characterised the result as a reasonable compromise that would be a guarantee for future co-operation of the private sector with the future Indonesian government. He also stated that he agreed with the opinion of many businessmen who were moderately favourable about the agreement, stating 'Business circles are generally optimistic about the success of co-operation, which is a foundation for the solution of future issues.' He may have pushed the argument a bit too far, because a meeting of IOB members on 22 November did not yield unanimous support for the outcome of the Linggajati negotiations.

By taking this stance, De Villeneuve defied the views of IOB's counterpart in the Netherlands, the Council of Entrepreneurs for colonial Indonesia (Ondernemersraad voor Nederlandsch-Indië), whose leaders still held uncompromising views and were tacitly opposed to the pragmatic standpoint of De Villeneuve. Ignoring the interests of entrepreneurs in Indonesia, they perceived Indonesia's independence as a risk to investors in the Netherlands. Its President, W.G.F. Jongejan, called on IOB members to sack De Villeneuve as President of the association. On 15 January 1947 the IOB board expressed the view 'that the interests of the entrepreneurs should be represented more forcefully', refuting De Villeneuve's view that these interests 'had to be viewed in the context of political developments in the world and especially in Indonesia'. Having lost the support of the IOB board, De Villeneuve resigned from the IOB Presidency. He took up a position as political and economic advisor for the governments of Lt Governor General Van Mook and after November 1948 Van Mook's successor L. Beel.

== 1950–1964: In Indonesia's public service ==
After the transfer of sovereignty in December 1949, De Villeneuve worked in the foreign trade section of Indonesia's Ministry of Economic Affairs and as an advisor for foreign trade issues at the Ministry of Foreign Affairs. Amongst others, he was involved in 1955 in Indonesia's organisation of the Asia-Africa conference in Bandung, and in Indonesia's trade negotiations with Singapore and Malaya.

He also had postings as commercial counsellor to the Indonesian embassies in London (UK), New Delhi (India) and Manila (The Philippines). From Manila, he warned Singapore, Malaya and Japan against taking up offers for barter trade from the Permesta rebel secessionists in North Sulawesi in 1958. De Villeneuve was still in Jakarta in 1961, but it is likely that he retired in 1962 when he turned 65.

De Villeneuve initially retired to the Netherlands, where he took the position of counsellor for international trade at the Embassy of Indonesia in The Hague. In 1962 and 1964 he was accredited as advisor to the mission of the Indonesian Ministry of Trade to the General Agreement on Trade and Tariffs meetings in Geneva.

Despite his loyal service to the Indonesian government during the 1950s, he may during the early 1960s have become weary of the economic hardship that the government of President Sukarno inflicted on the Indonesian population. Following the change of government in 1966, De Villeneuve discussed these difficulties in a 1967 article in which he also expressed cautious optimism that the new government of President Suharto would turn the economic situation around.

== Personal life ==
De Villeneuve's youngest son, Peter, drowned in July 1946 in the Lake of Geneva during a rain storm. His marriage did not survive the difficult 1940s. During a visit to Europe in June–September 1948, De Villeneuve and Mees divorced in Rotterdam on 20 July 1948. De Villeneuve married Irene Mildred Holloway in Londen a few days later on 27 July 1948. They had met at the British representation in Jakarta where she had been secretary to the British Consul General Sir Francis Shepherd. His third son, Henk, died in 1952 after a fall from a radio tower in Richmond (USA), where he was studying in Williamstown (Massachusetts).

== Awards and retirement ==
The Dutch government appointed van De Villeneuve Ridder in de Orde van de Nederlandse Leeuw in 1940 and awarded him the Verzetster Oost Azië 1942–1945 for his role in Japan's detention, while the British government awarded him a King's Commendation for Brave Conduct.

In the late-1960s, De Villeneuve retired to Spain where he became honorary consul for Indonesia. He died in Barcelona on 12 March 1974.
