= Epse =

- Village
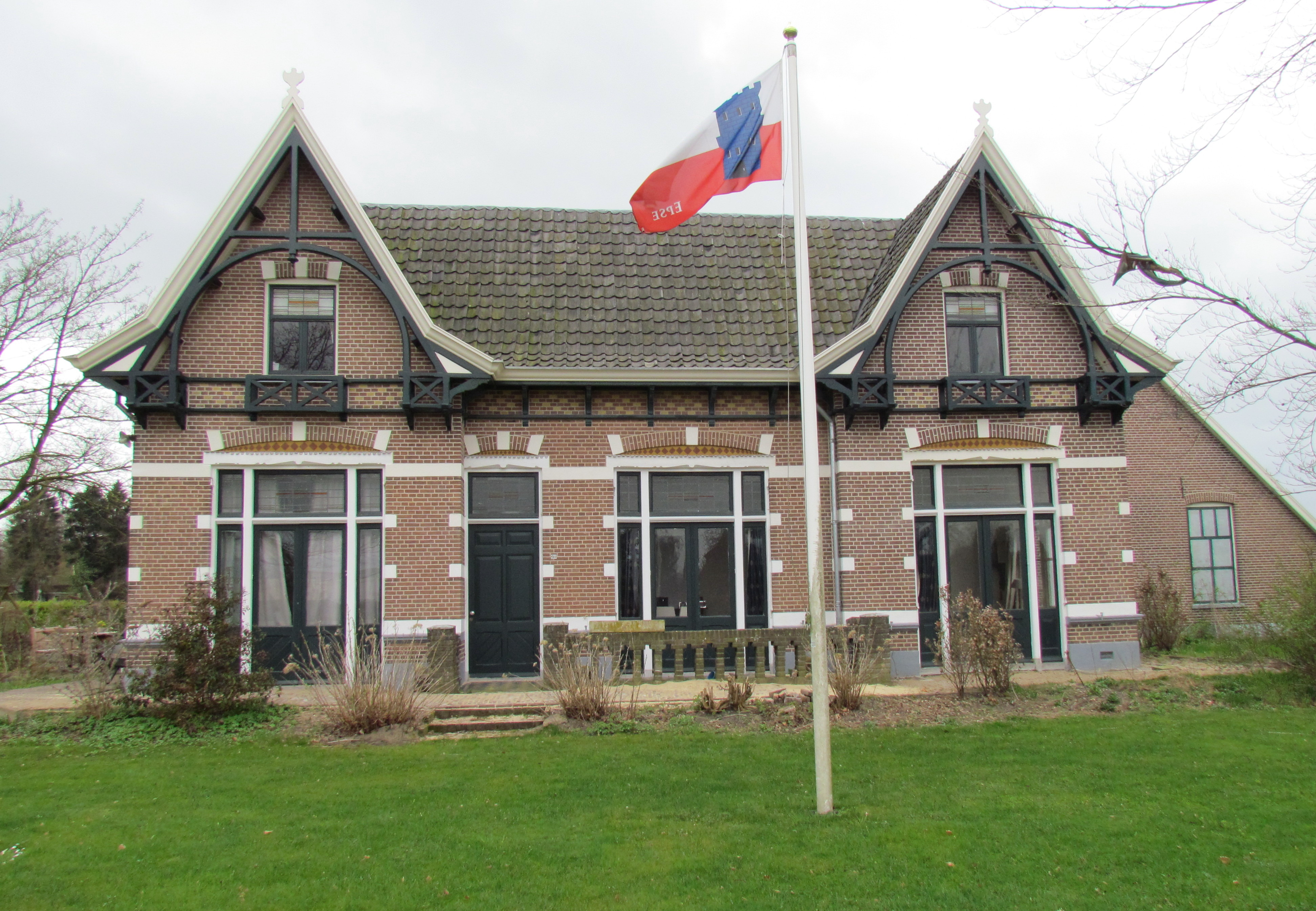
- Farm in Epse

- Flag

- Location in the Netherlands Epse (Netherlands)
- Coordinates: 52.22487°N 6.19949°E
- Country: Netherlands
- Province: Gelderland
- Municipality: Lochem

Area
  - Total: 8.85 km^{2} (3.42 sq mi)
- Elevation: 7 m (23 ft)

Population (2021)
  - Total: 2,069
  - Density: 234/km^{2} (606/sq mi)
- Time zone: UTC+1 (CET)
  - Summer (DST): UTC+2 (CEST)
- Postal code: 7214
- Dialing code: 0575

Epse is a village in the municipality of Lochem, province of Gelderland, Netherlands. It lies south of the A1 motorway and north of Gorssel, which was a separate municipality encompassing Epse until 2005, when it was merged with Lochem. In 2021, the village had a population of 2,069. The Dutch Reformed Church at its centre was built in 1930.

== History ==
It was first mentioned in 1195 as de Epse. The etymology is unclear. In 1840, it was home to 567 people. The Dutch Reformed Church was built in 1930. In 2021, it was announced that the church will close in 2023, and the Catholic church in neighbouring Joppe will also close. In 2000, a northern section of Epse was transferred to Deventer for the construction of an industrial zone. The area was home to 58 people.
