= Gorssel =

- Village
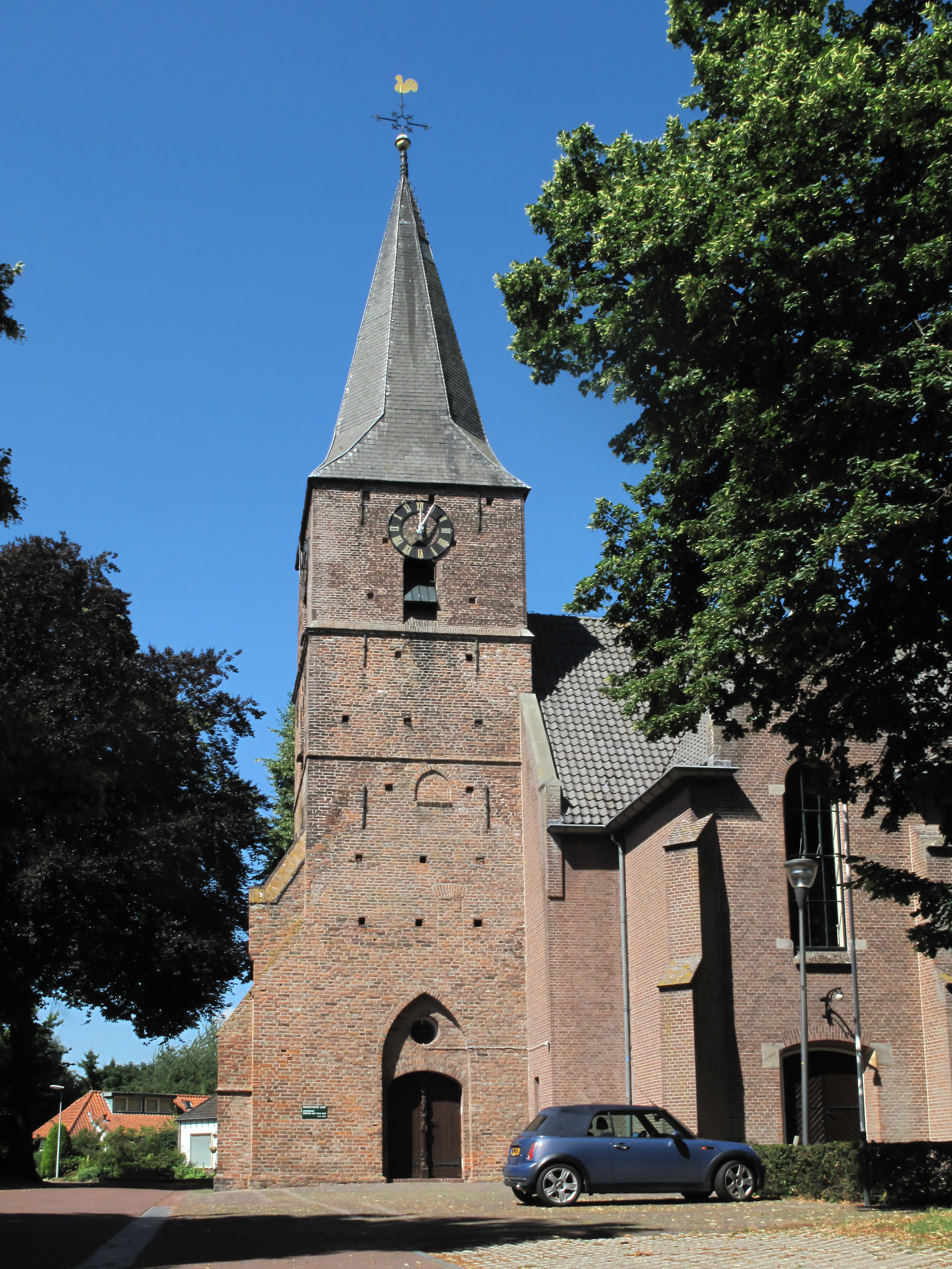
- Reformed church

- Flag Coat of arms
- Interactive map of Gorssel
- Coordinates: 52°12′N 6°12′E
- Country: Netherlands
- Province: Gelderland
- Municipality: Lochem

Population (2015)
  - Total: 4,043

Gorssel is a village in the municipality of Lochem, province of Gelderland, Netherlands. It is located about 9 km (5.6 mi) southeast of the city centre of Deventer, Overijssel. In 2015, it had a population of 4,043.

The microbiologist and botanist Martinus Beijerinck lived in Gorssel for the last part of his life, and died there in 1931.

== History ==
In 1831, the municipality of Dorth was merged into Gorssel. Gorssel was a separate municipality until 2005, when it was merged with Lochem. Before the fusion, the municipality of Gorssel contained the towns of Gorssel, Epse, Eefde, Almen, Harfsen, Joppe and Kring van Dorth.

== Geography ==
Gorssel is a small, relatively wealthy village, situated in a forest area in the eastern part of Gelderland. It is a gate to the Achterhoek natural region. It is bordered to the west by the river IJssel.
