= Joppe, Netherlands =

Joppe
- Village
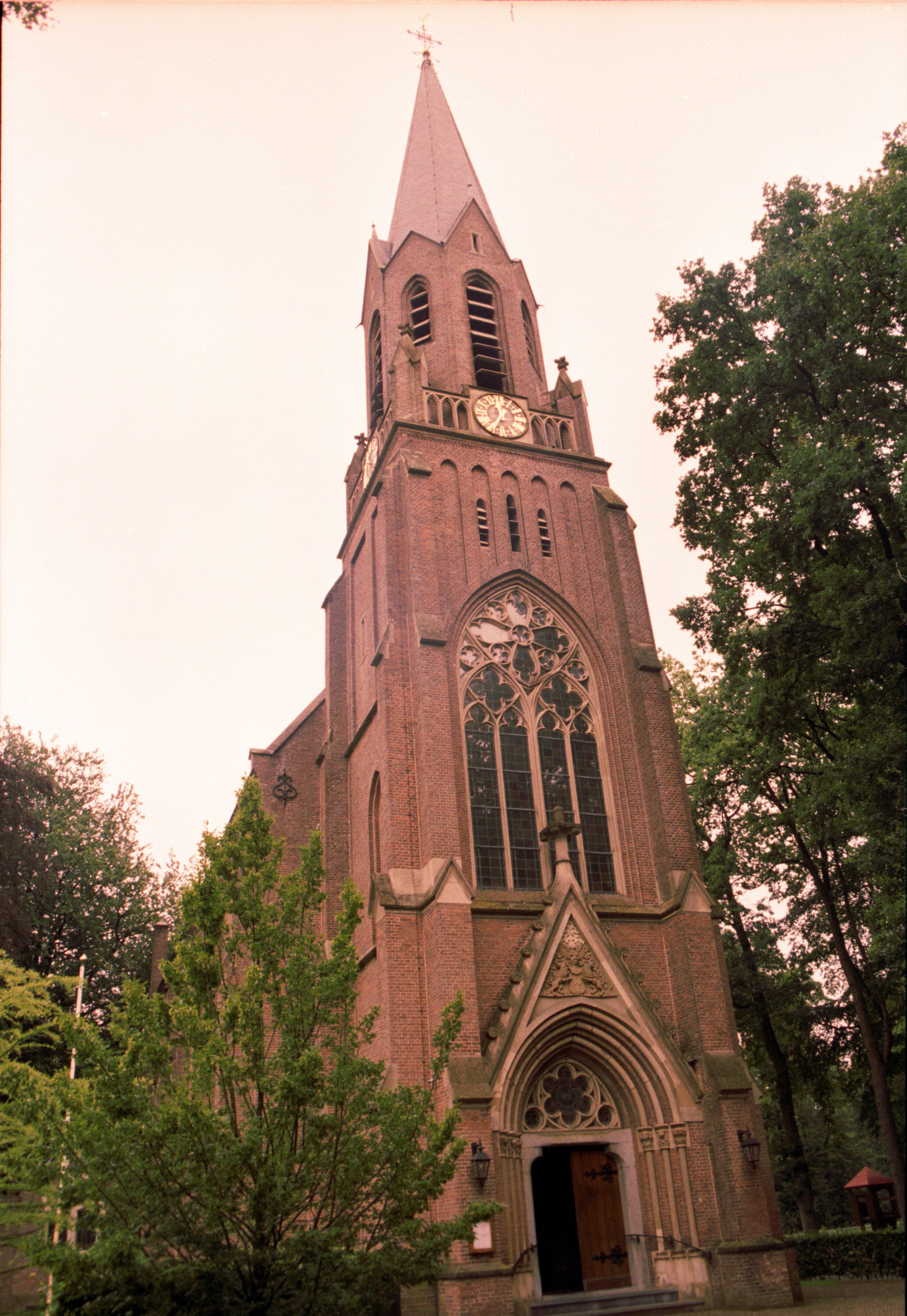
- Church of Joppe

- Location in the Netherlands Joppe (Netherlands)
- Coordinates: 52.2086°N 6.2309°E
- Country: Netherlands
- Province: Gelderland
- Municipality: Lochem

Area
  - Total: 7.20 km^{2} (2.78 sq mi)
- Elevation: 8 m (26 ft)

Population (2021)
  - Total: 435
  - Density: 60.4/km^{2} (156/sq mi)
- Time zone: UTC+1 (CET)
  - Summer (DST): UTC+2 (CEST)
- Postal code: 7215
- Dialing code: 0575

Joppe is a village in the municipality of Lochem in the province of Gelderland, Netherlands.

It was first mentioned in 1608 as Jobstede, and means "the city of Job (person)". The village started as a Catholic enclave near Huis 't Joppe which is an estate dating from 1736. The estate was restored between 1965 and 1967. The Catholic church dates from 1867. The railway station Gorssel which existed between 1865 and 1935 was actually located in Joppe.

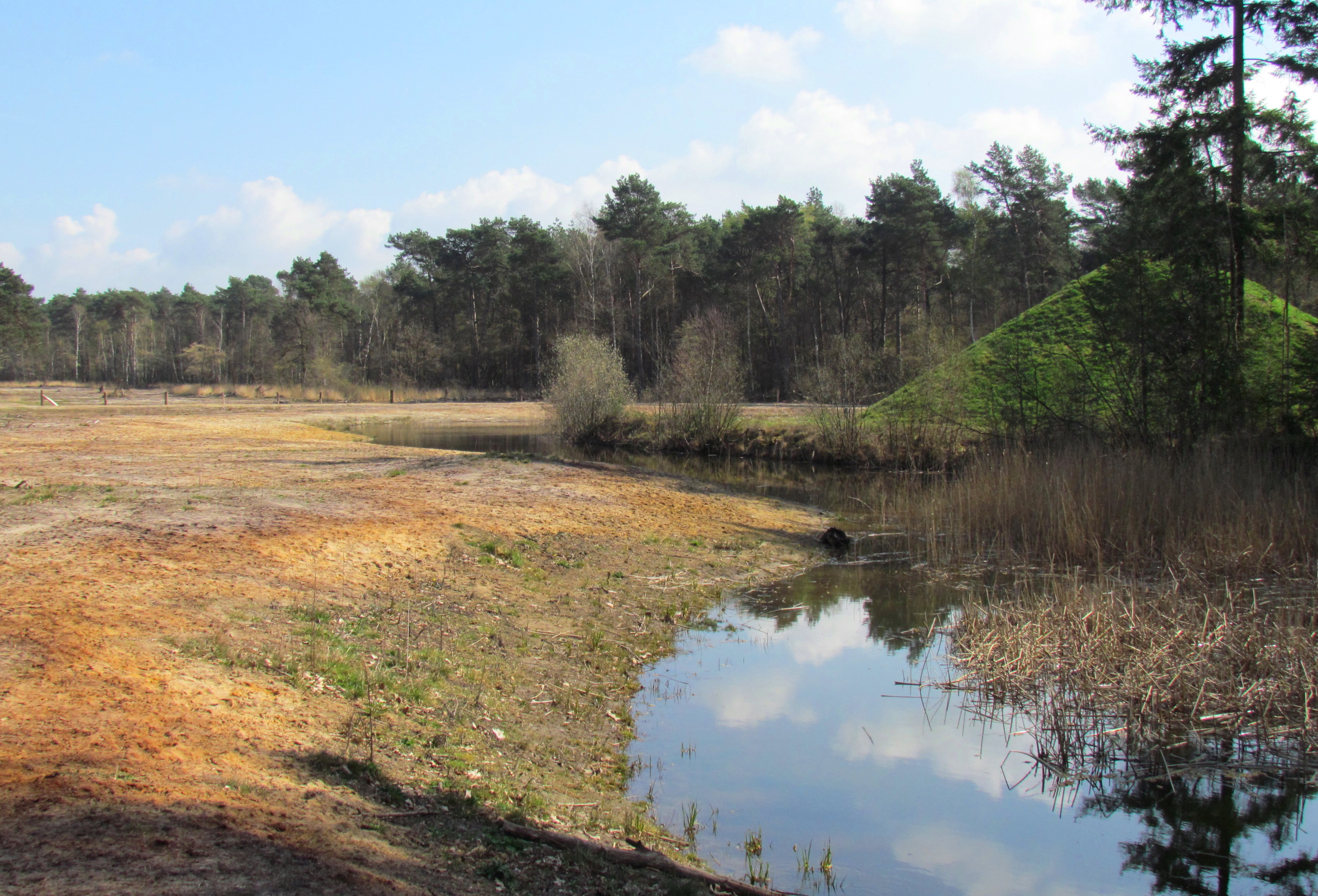
Gorsselse Heide near Joppe
