= Nettelhorsterbrug =

Planned bridge in Lochem, the Netherlands

2024 Nettelhorsterbrug collapse
- Date: 21 February 2024
- Time: 11:00 am (CET; UTC+1)
- Location: Lochem, Netherlands; 52.16481°N 6.42979°E
- Type: Bridge collapse
- Deaths: 2
- Injuries: 2–5

The Nettelhorsterbrug is a bridge being built by the Royal BAM Group over the Twentekanaal as part of provincial road N346 in Lochem, the Netherlands. The bridge's name pays homage to the nearby hamlet Nettelhorst, chosen through an electoral process. On 21 February 2024 at 11:00 am Central European Time (UTC+1), a segment of the Nettelhorsterbrug under construction collapsed, resulting in two fatalities and two to five injuries.

== Bridge ==
Upon completion, the bridge will span 136 meters in length, 25 meters in height, and 12.5 meters in width, with a total weight of 1.3 million kilograms (2.9 million pounds). Bridges of such dimensions are uncommon in the Netherlands.

Manufactured by Aelterman in Ghent, Belgium, the bridge components were transported to Lochem for assembly due to the unsuitability of the current infrastructure around the Twentekanaal for shipping entire bridge constructions on pontoons.

== Collapse ==
Part of the bridge collapsed shortly after 11:00 AM local time (UTC+1) on 21 February 2024, while workmen were hoisting arches. The rescue operation commenced at 11:11 AM, involving three trauma teams by helicopters and numerous emergency vehicles. Initial assessments by experts suggest that the cranes used were adequate for the task, and the disaster was attributed to a broken lifting point.

The victims of the collapse included two individuals not affiliated with the Royal BAM Group, one employed by Belgian construction company Aertssen and the other of Polish nationality. Additionally, two Belgian individuals sustained injuries and were hospitalized, with one discharged from the hospital on 23 February.

An investigation into the cause of the collapse is being conducted by the Nederlandse Arbeidsinspectie, and no work on the bridge will resume for at least a week pending the investigation. Prime Minister of the Netherlands, Mark Rutte, expressed condolences, describing the accident as "tragic" and extending wishes for strength to the victims and their families.
