= Gijs Verdick =

Dutch cyclist (1994–2016)

Personal information
- Born: 23 June 1994 Laren, Gelderland, Netherlands
- Died: 9 May 2016 (aged 21) Zwolle, Netherlands
- Height: 1.74 m (5 ft 9 in)
- Weight: 59 kg (130 lb)

Cycling career
- Sport: Cycling
- Discipline: Road cycling
- Role: Rider

Professional team
- 2016: Cyclingteam Jo Piels

Gijs Verdick (23 June 1994 – 9 May 2016) was a Dutch professional cyclist. In early 2016 he rode for Cyclingteam Jo Piels. On the night of May 2 and 3, 2016, he suffered two heart attacks during the under-23 Carpathian Couriers Race in Poland. On 8 May he was brought from Poland to the Isala hospital in Zwolle, Netherlands, where he died the day after. After his death, several of his organs were offered up for donation.

== Major results ==
2014
Nacht van Hengelo
2015
Nacht van Hengelo
