= Indonesian Railways Workers' Union =

Indonesian Railways Worker's Union
- Abbreviation: SPKA
- Formation: 14 September 1999
- Purpose: Social
- Headquarters: Bandung, Indonesia
- Location: Jl. Perintis Kemerdekaan No. 1 Bandung
- Region served: Indonesia
- Leader: Sri Nugroho
- Parent organization: PT. Kereta Api Indonesia (Persero)
- Website: http://www.dppspka.com/

The Indonesian Railway Workers Union is an Indonesian trade union.
