= Laren, Gelderland =

Laren
- Village
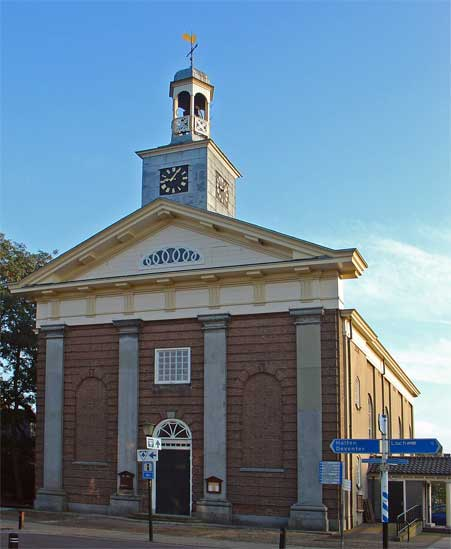
- Reformed church of Laren

- Flag Coat of arms

- Location in the Netherlands Laren (Netherlands)
- Coordinates: 52.193°N 6.366°E
- Country: Netherlands
- Province: Gelderland
- Municipality: Lochem

Area
  - Total: 53.85 km^{2} (20.79 sq mi)
- Elevation: 12 m (39 ft)

Population (2021)
  - Total: 4,370
  - Density: 81.2/km^{2} (210/sq mi)
- Time zone: UTC+1 (CET)
  - Summer (DST): UTC+2 (CEST)
- Postal code: 7245
- Dialing code: 0573

Laren is a village in the Dutch province of Gelderland. It is located in the municipality of Lochem. Laren was a separate municipality until 1971, when it was merged with Lochem.

== History ==
It was first mentioned between 1294 and 1295 as Lare, and means pasture in forest. Laren developed into a village in the 19th century along the road from Lochem to Deventer. In 1835, the Dutch Reformed Church was completed. In 1840, it was home to 612 people.

Huis Verwolde is a former havezate. It was first mentioned in 1346. In 1510, it was ordered destroyed by the Prince-Bishop of Utrecht and torn down. In 1776, it was replaced by the current building. In 1927, a tower was added to the estate. In 1976, it was sold. It has been opened for visitors, and there are holiday homes near the estate.

== People ==
- Gijs Verdick (1994-2016), professional cyclist

== Gallery ==
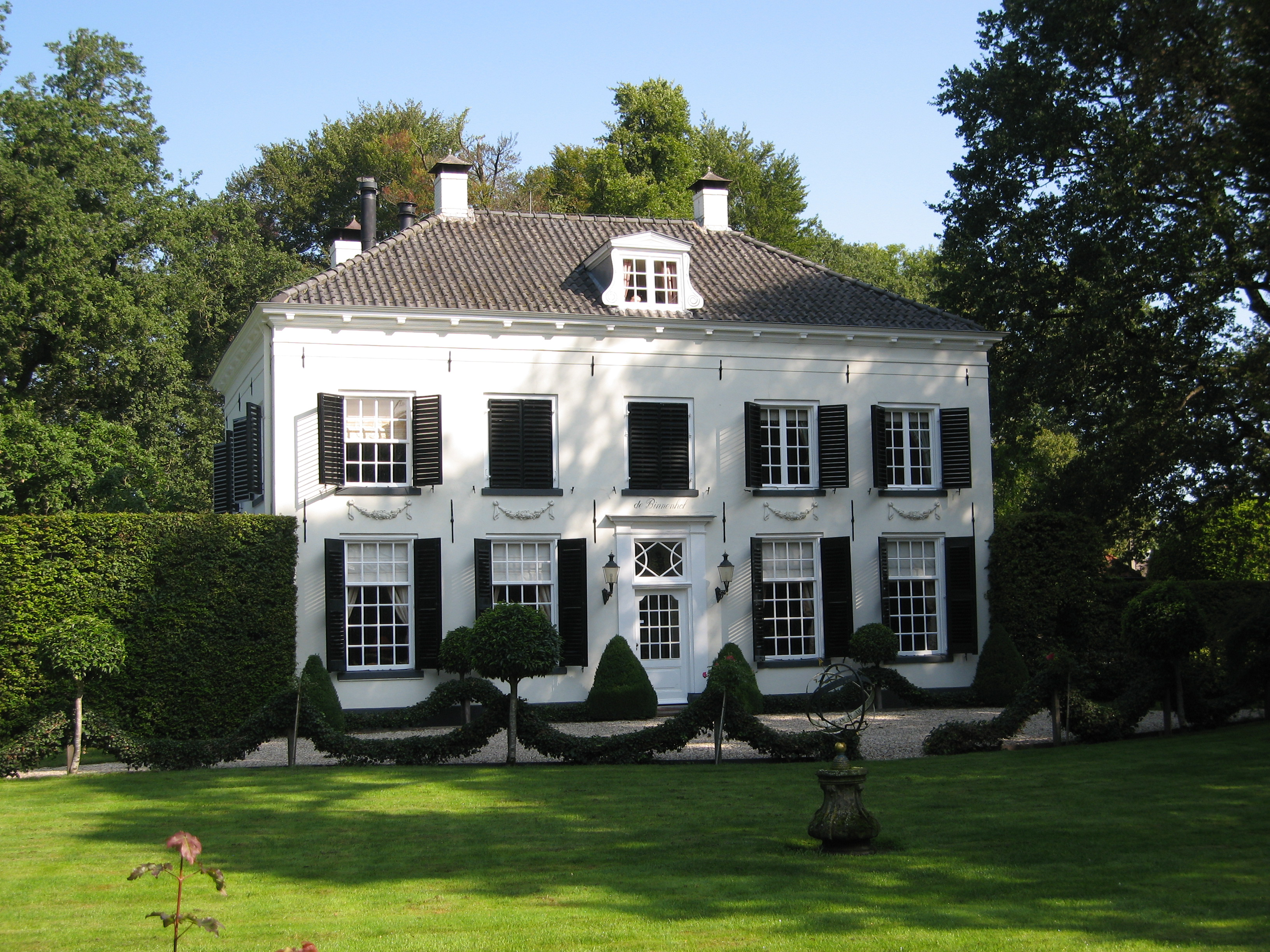
Villa in Laren

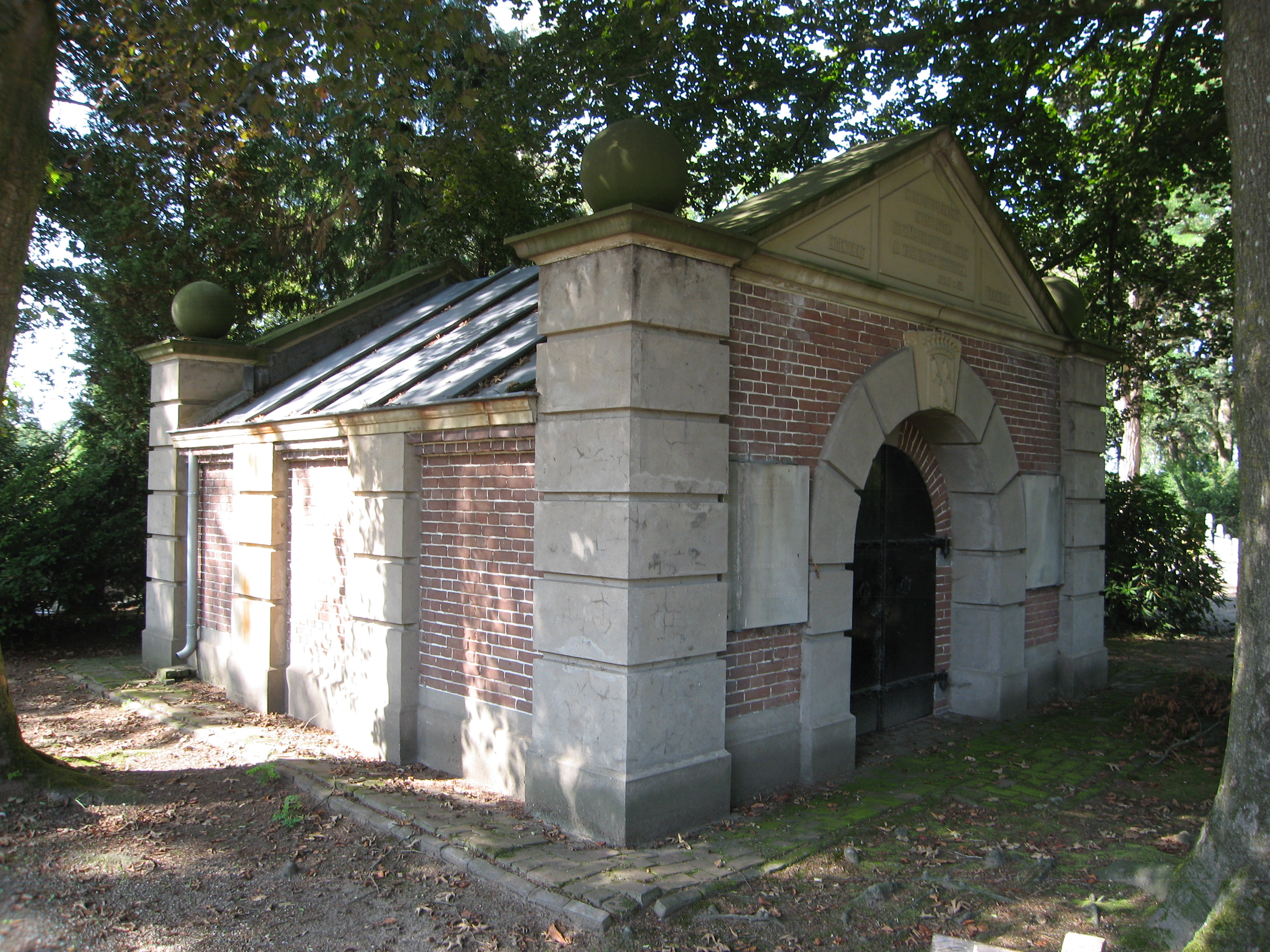
Tomb

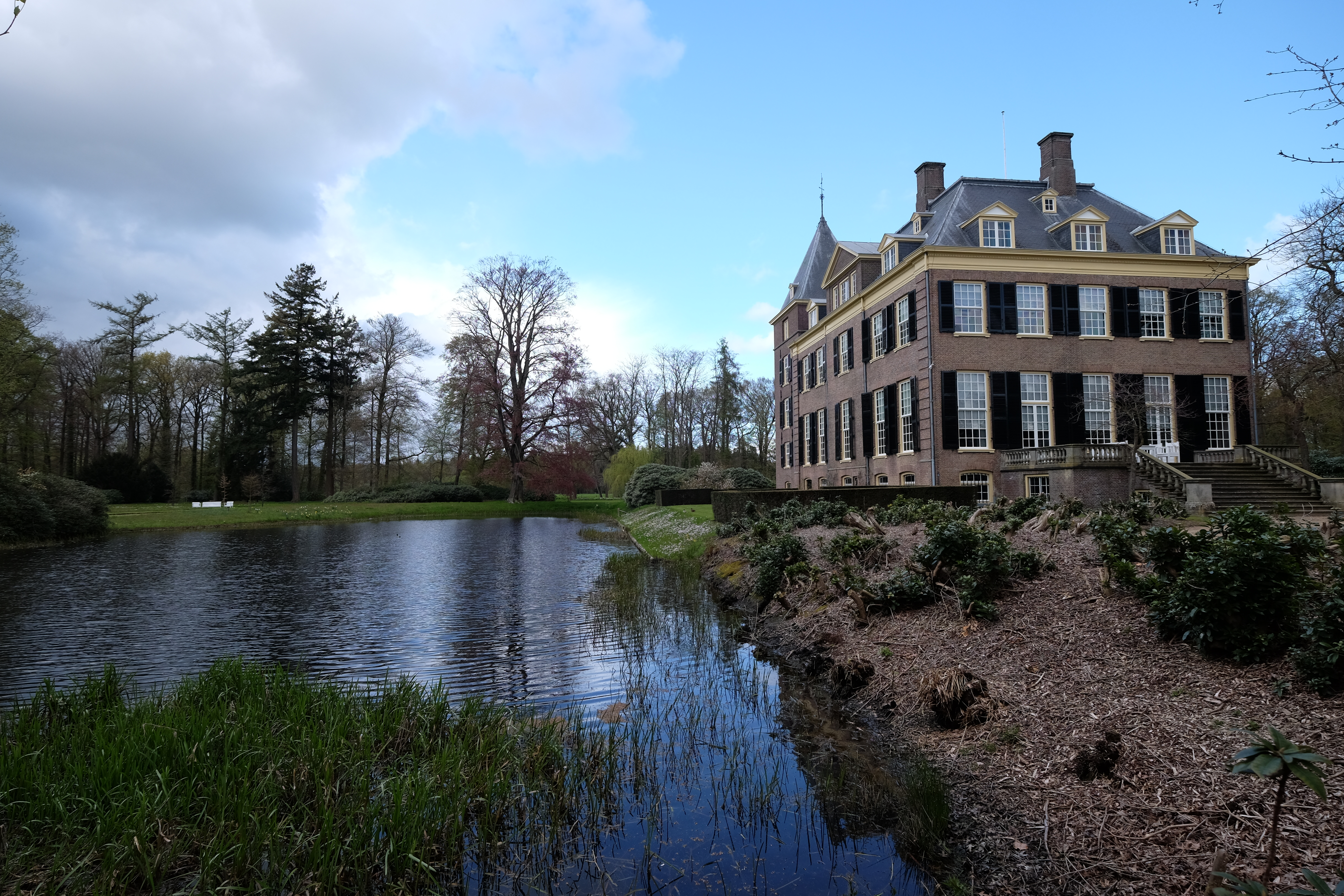
Huis Verwolde

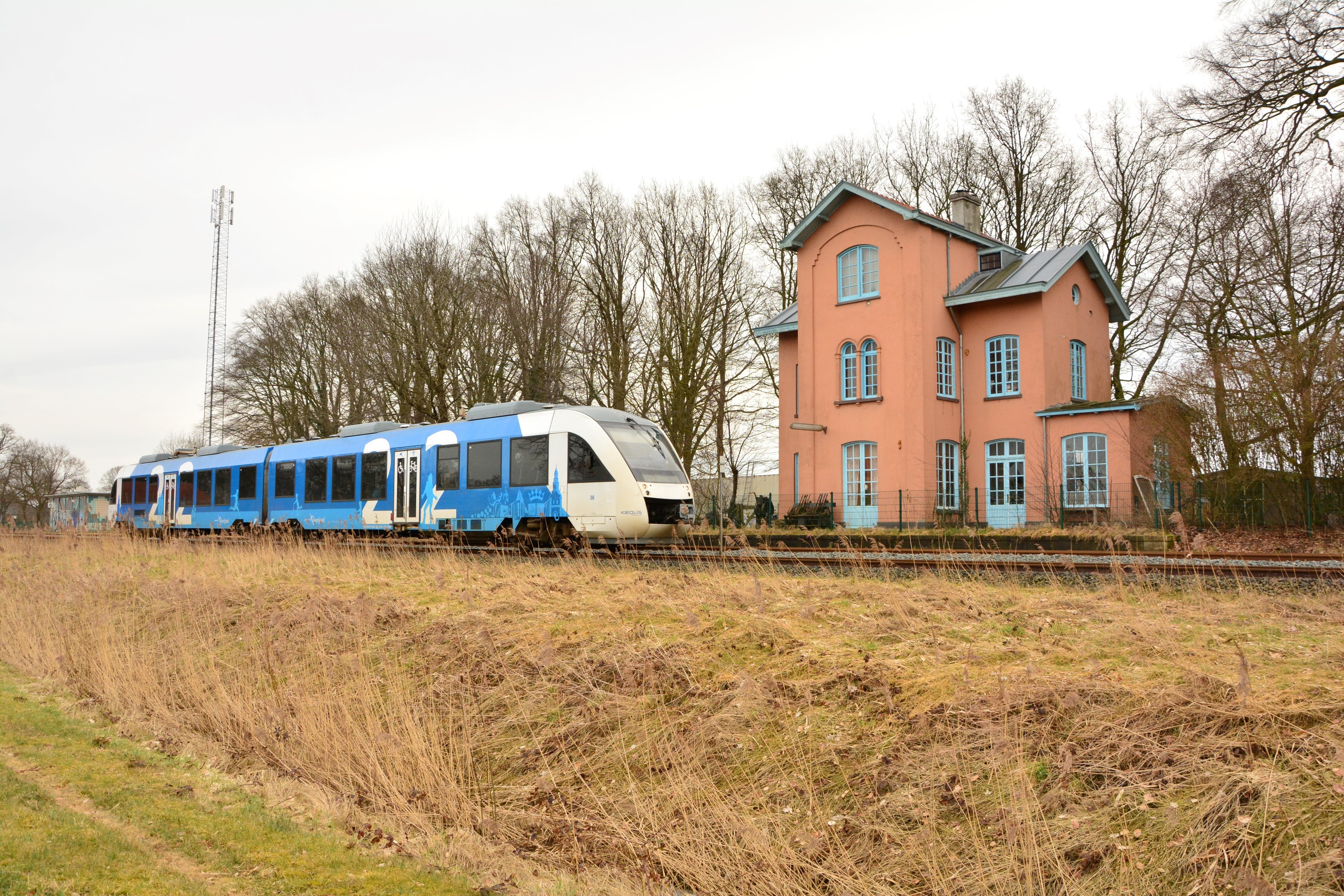
Train station Almen-Laren
