= Lochem =

- City and municipality
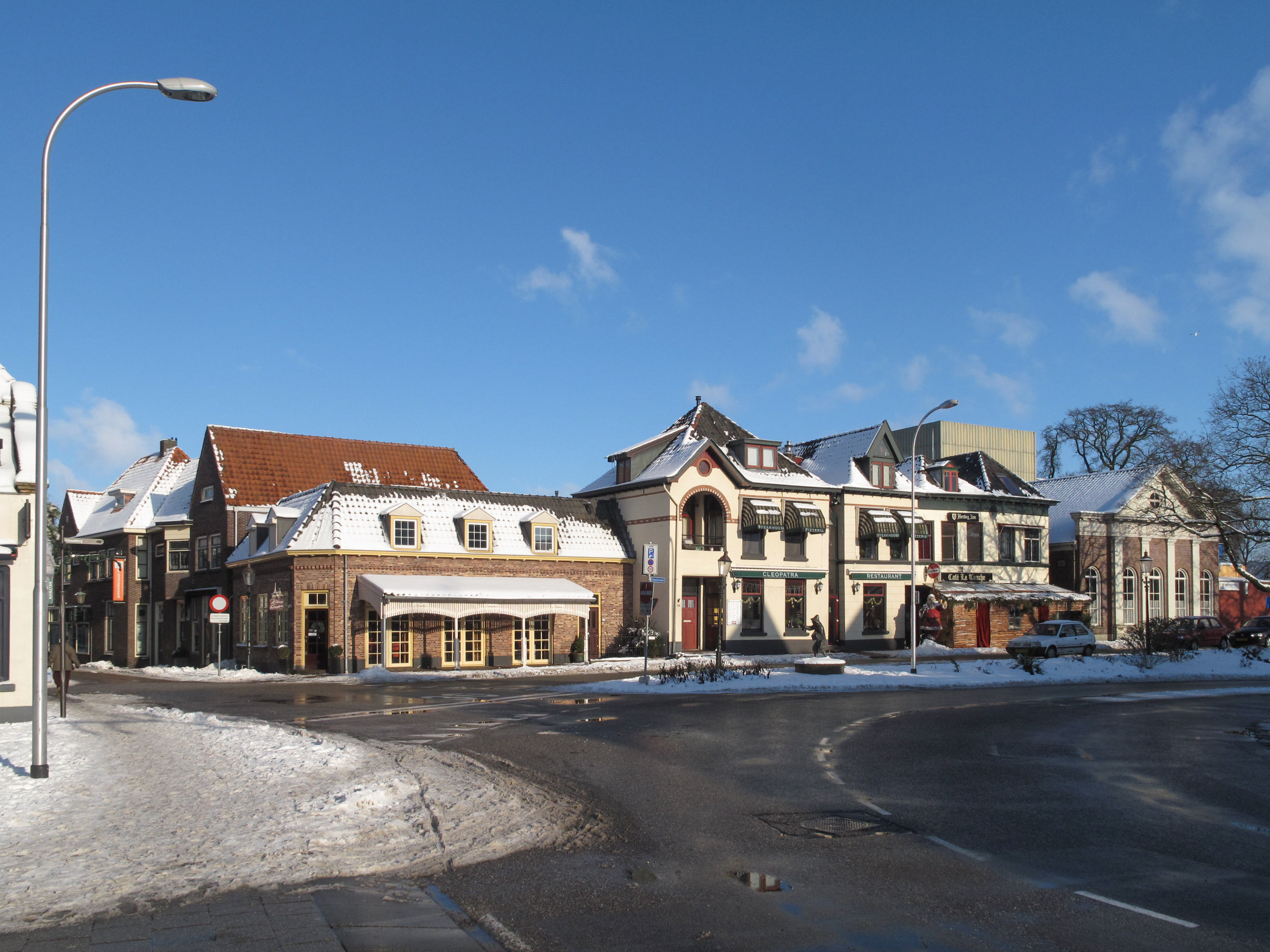
- City centre of Lochem

- Flag Coat of arms

- Location in Gelderland
- Coordinates: 52.16145°N 6.41519°E
- Country: Netherlands
- Province: Gelderland

Government
  - Body: Municipal council
  - Mayor: Frans Backhuijs (VVD)

Area
  - Total: 215.94 km^{2} (83.37 sq mi)
  - Land: 213.03 km^{2} (82.25 sq mi)
  - Water: 2.91 km^{2} (1.12 sq mi)
- Elevation: 14 m (46 ft)

Population (January 2021)
  - Total: 33,948
  - Density: 159/km^{2} (410/sq mi)
- Demonym: Lochemer
- Time zone: UTC+1 (CET)
  - Summer (DST): UTC+2 (CEST)
- Postcode: 7210–7218, 7240–7245
- Area code: 0573, 0575
- Website: lochem.nl

Lochem (Dutch pronunciation: [ˈlɔxəm]) is a city and municipality in the province of Gelderland in the Eastern Netherlands. In 2005, it merged with the municipality of Gorssel, retaining the name of Lochem. As of 2019, it had a population of 33,590.

== Population centres ==
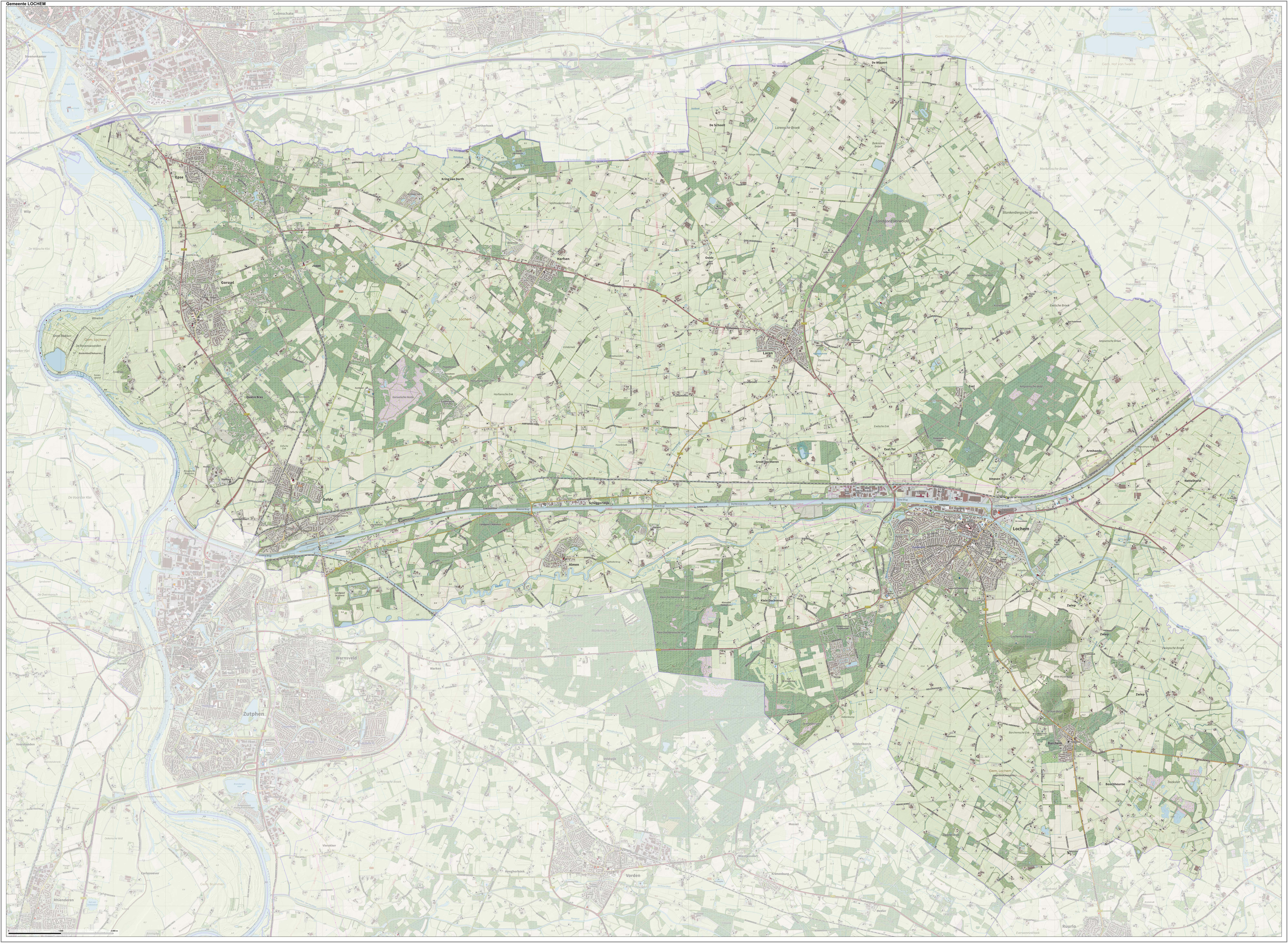
Map of the municipality of Lochem, 2015

The city of Lochem is the municipality's main population centre. The villages of Barchem and Laren were already in the municipality of Lochem before 2005. Almen, Eefde (immediately north of Zutphen), Epse, Harfsen and Gorssel itself were in the municipality of Gorssel until 2005, when they became part of the municipality of Lochem.

=== City of Lochem ===
Lochem, 18 km (11 mi) east of Zutphen, received city rights in 1233. Until the 17th century, it was often besieged and burnt down. After 1700, it became a small market town for local farmers.

The village of Laren has a castle called Huis Verwolde, which has guided tours in the summer. A tree on its estate is said to be the thickest tree in the Netherlands ("de dikke boom van Verwolde").

== Transport ==
Lochem is served by Lochem railway station, on the Zutphen–Glanerbeek railway.

== History ==
Lochem received city rights in 1233 from Count Otto II of Guelders. It was a fortified town that was often besieged and burned down by various enemies, such as the Bishop of Utrecht, the Duke of Burgundy, and the Spanish troops.

Lochem played a role in the Eighty Years' War, resisting several attempts by the Spanish to capture it. In 1590, a local hero named Jan de Poorter foiled a plot by the Spanish to enter the city disguised as hay wagons. After 1700, Lochem became a small market town for the farmers in its surroundings. It also developed some industries, such as leather, tobacco, and paper. Lochem was occupied by the French from 1795 to 1813, and suffered from plundering and requisitions. In 1818, Lochem became part of the newly formed province of Gelderland.

In 1763, Lochem experienced the "Night of Fire" on Christmas. A group of young Germans ignited the church and numerous significant buildings.

Lochem boasts various historical landmarks, including the St. Gudula Church, originating from the 11th century and housing a renowned organ from 1834. The town features a museum, a theater, and a music venue. Laren, a village within the Lochem municipality, is home to Huis Verwolde Castle, erected in 1776 and available for public viewing. Lochem is set amidst natural landscapes of forests, hills, and open fields, making it a popular area for activities like hiking, cycling, and golfing.

In February 2024, the Lochem bridge collapsed, with deaths and injuries resulting.

== Notable people ==
- Johan van Dorth (1574 in Salvador – 1624), schout of Lochem and nobleman and general of the Dutch Republic
- Robert Jasper van der Capellen (1743 in Eefde – 1814) a scion from the noble regenten family Van der Capellen from Guelders
- Carel de Villeneuve (1897 in Lochem – 1974) a lawyer and director of business associations in colonial Indonesia during the 1920s–1940s
- Hans Jorritsma (1949 in Lochem – 2026) a retired field hockey player, competed at the 1976 Summer Olympics
- Irma Boom (born 1960 in Lochem) a graphic designer—who specializes in book making

== Gallery ==
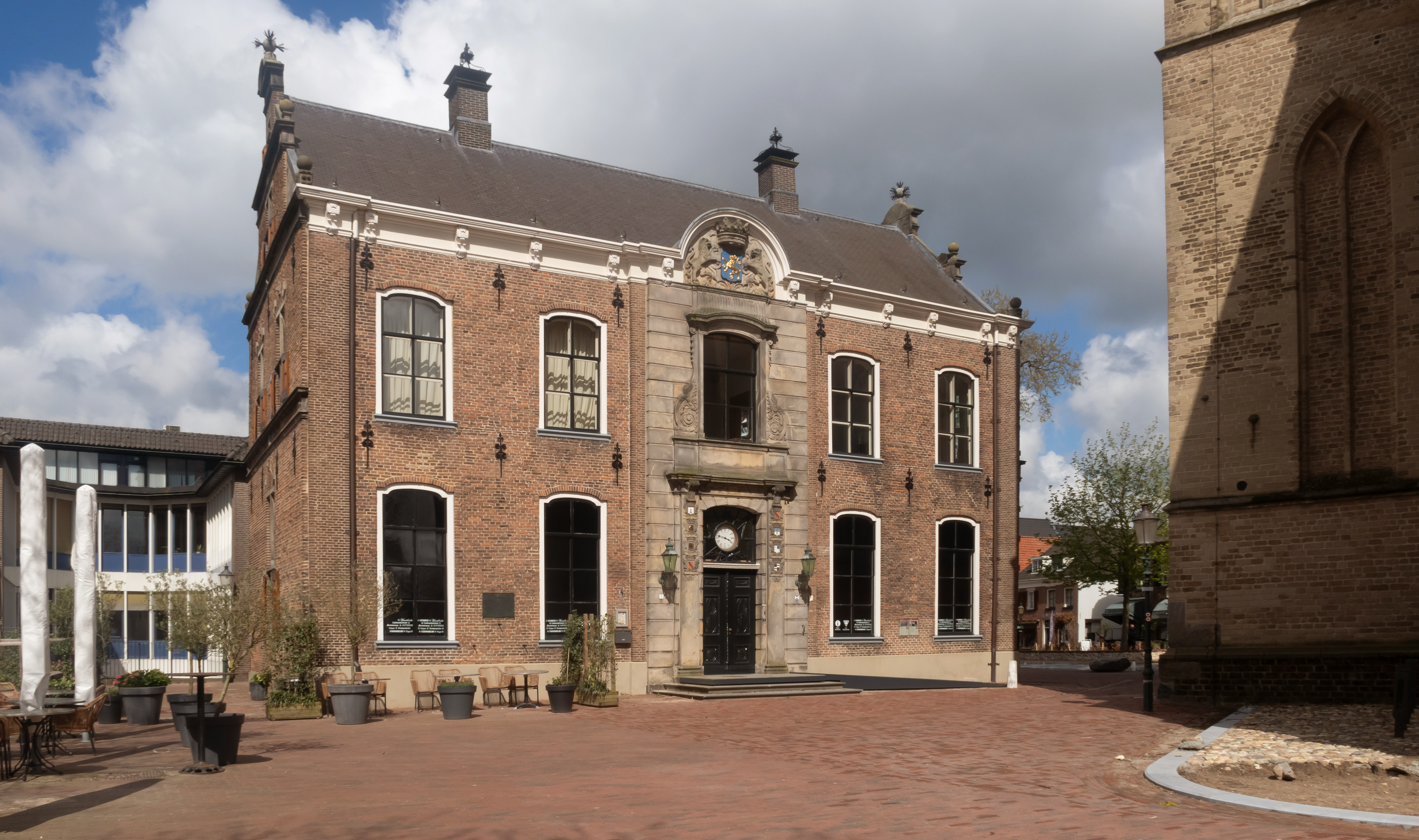
Former town hall

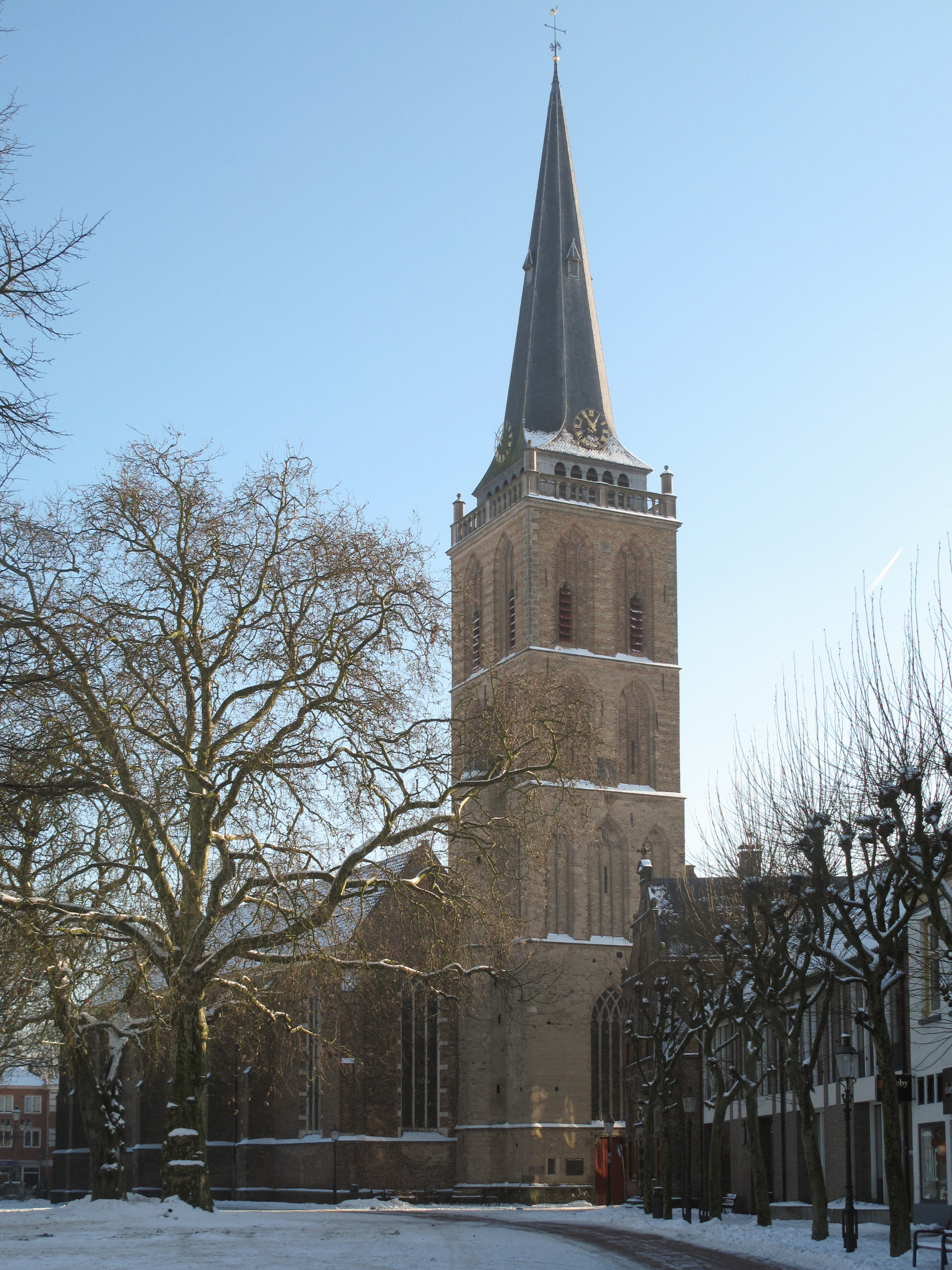
De Gudulakerk

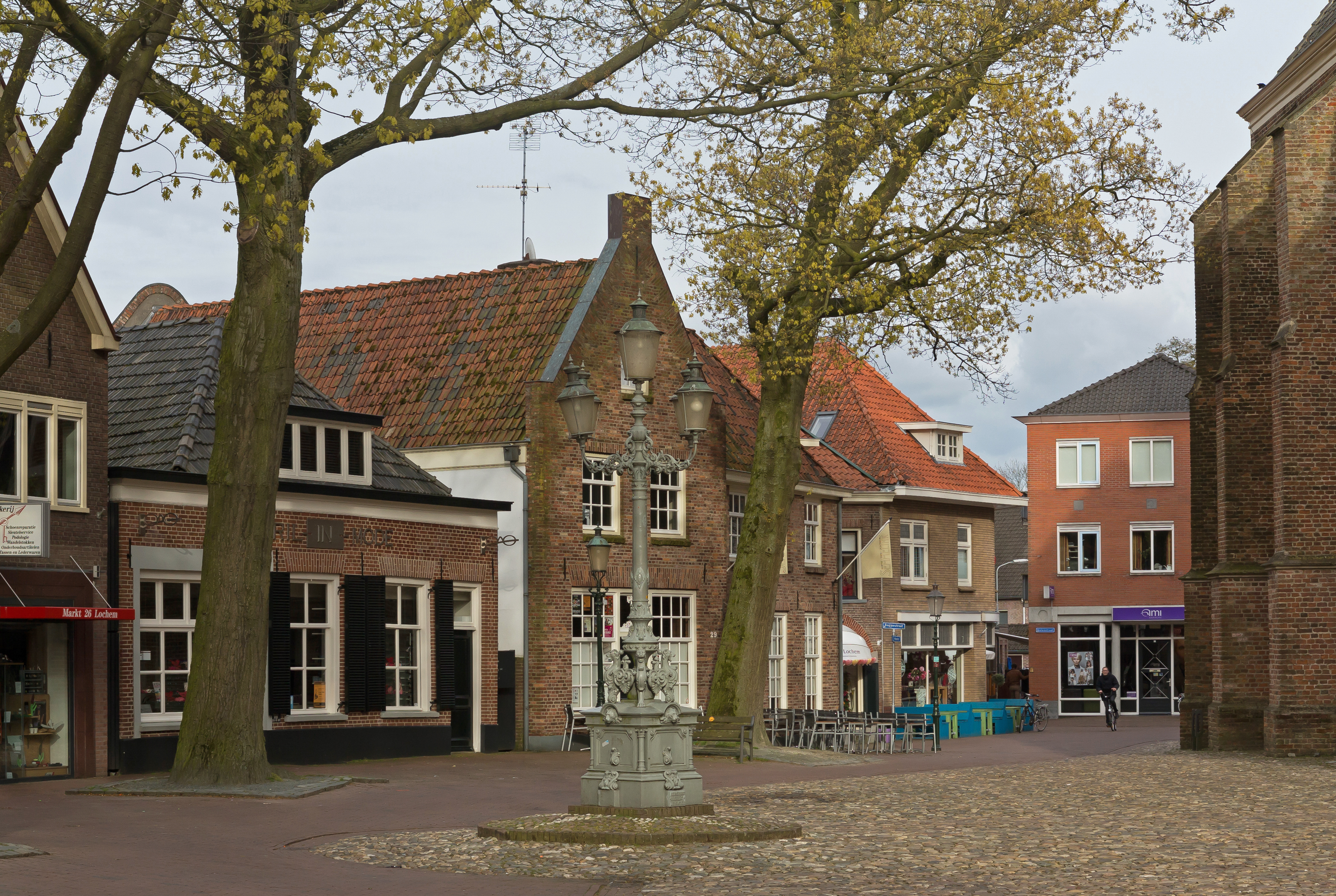
Monumental street light

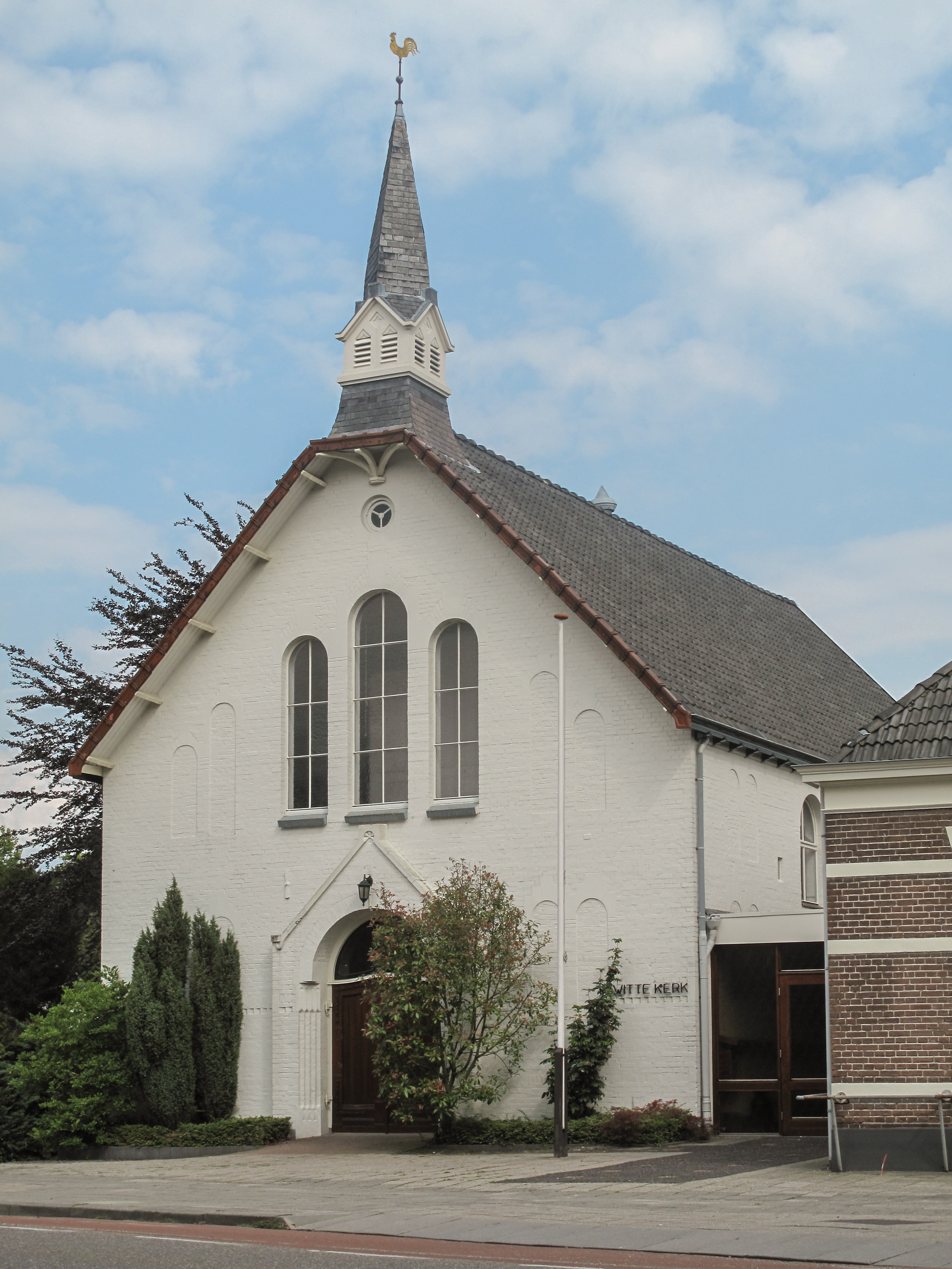
De Witte Kerk

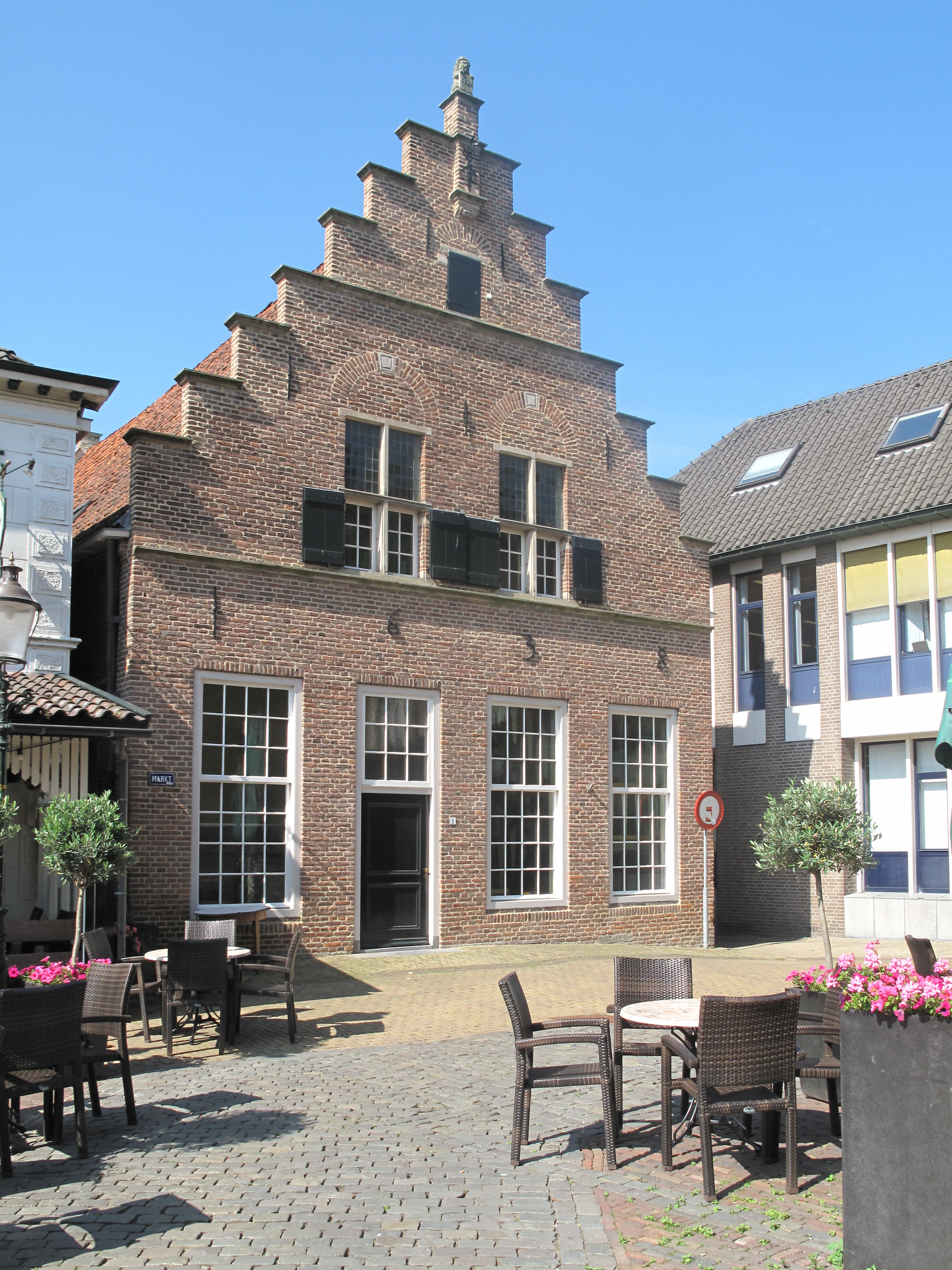
Monumental house on the Markt

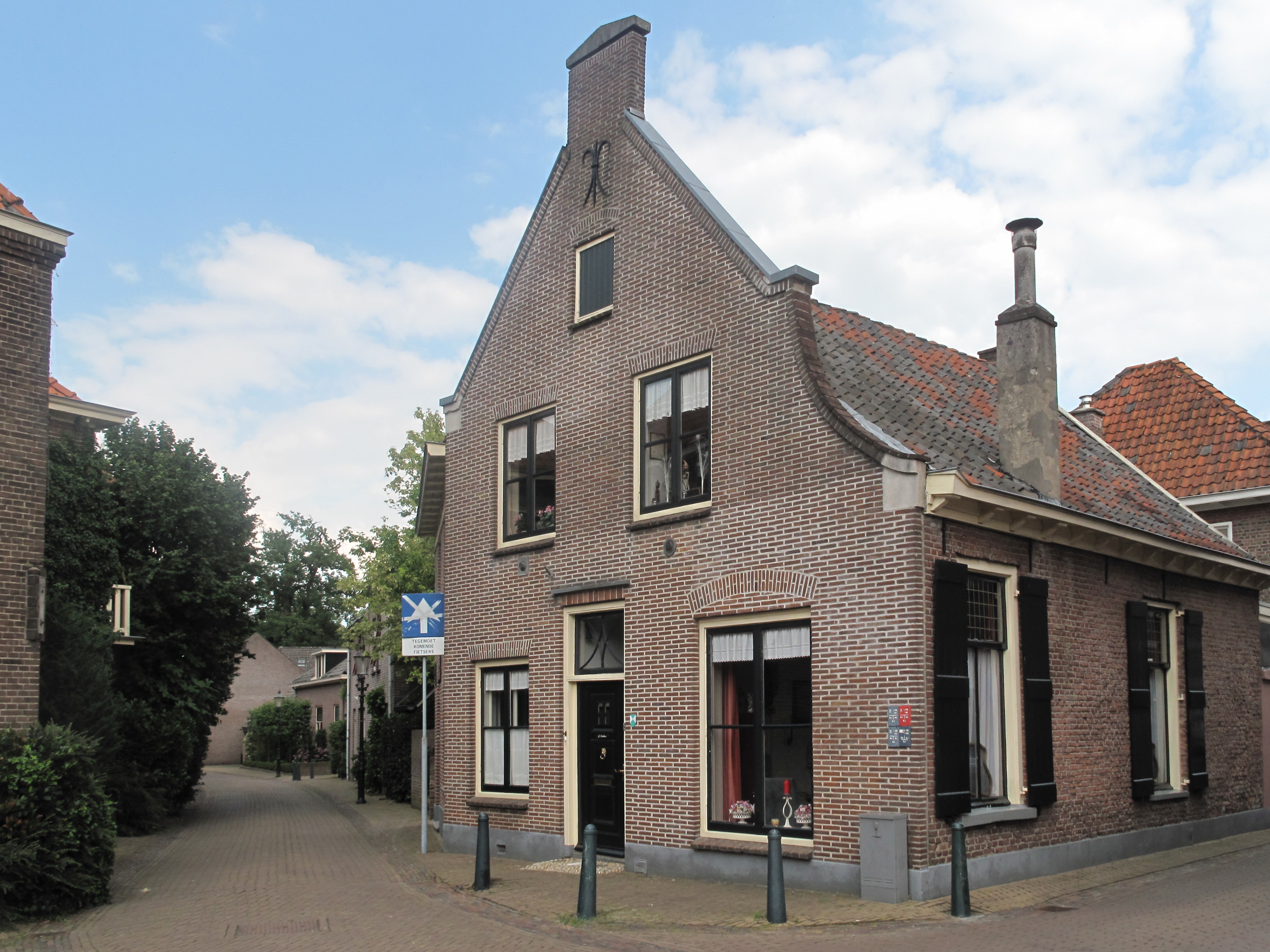
House at 't Ei

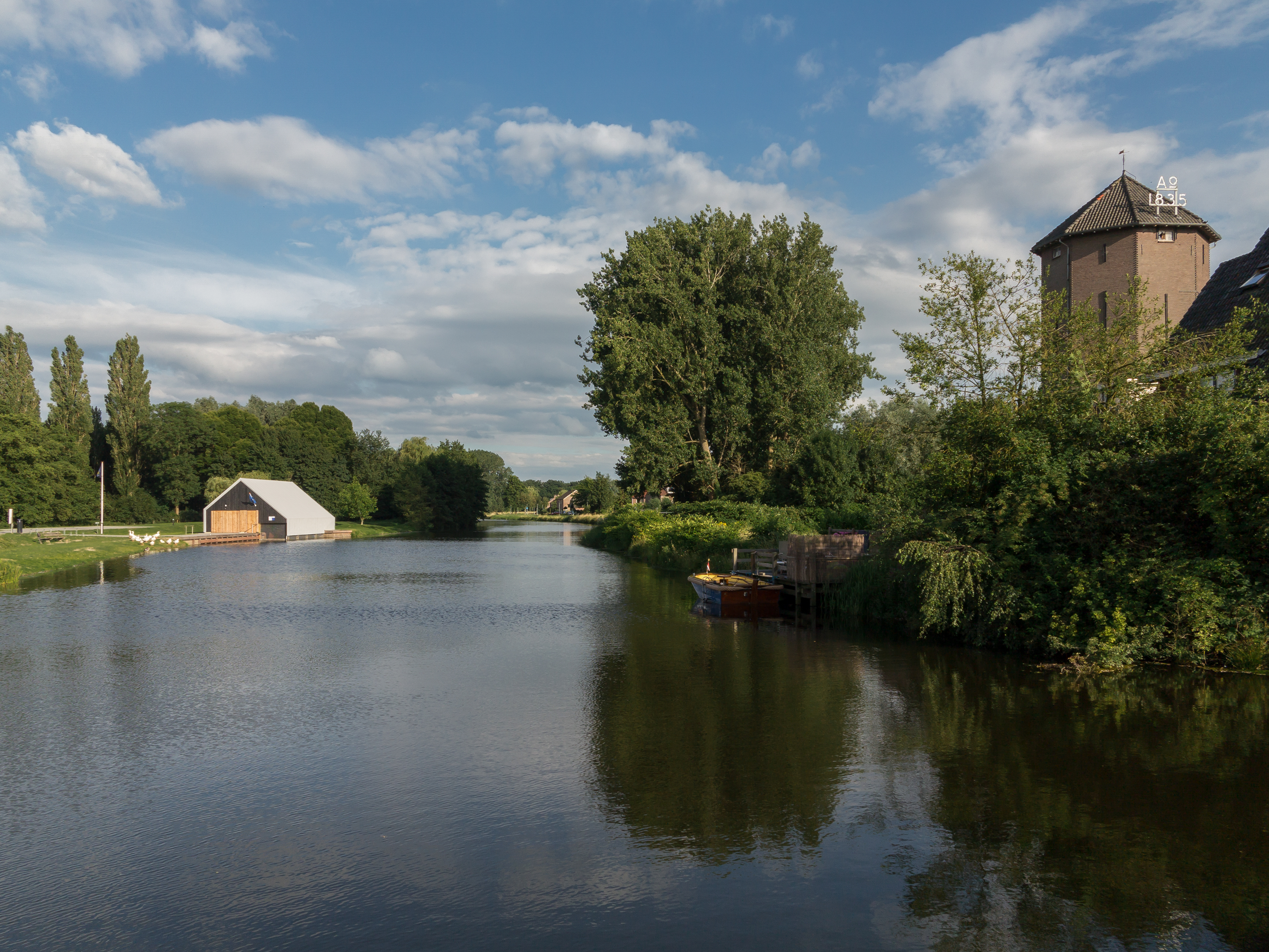
River Berkel from De Graaf Ottoweg

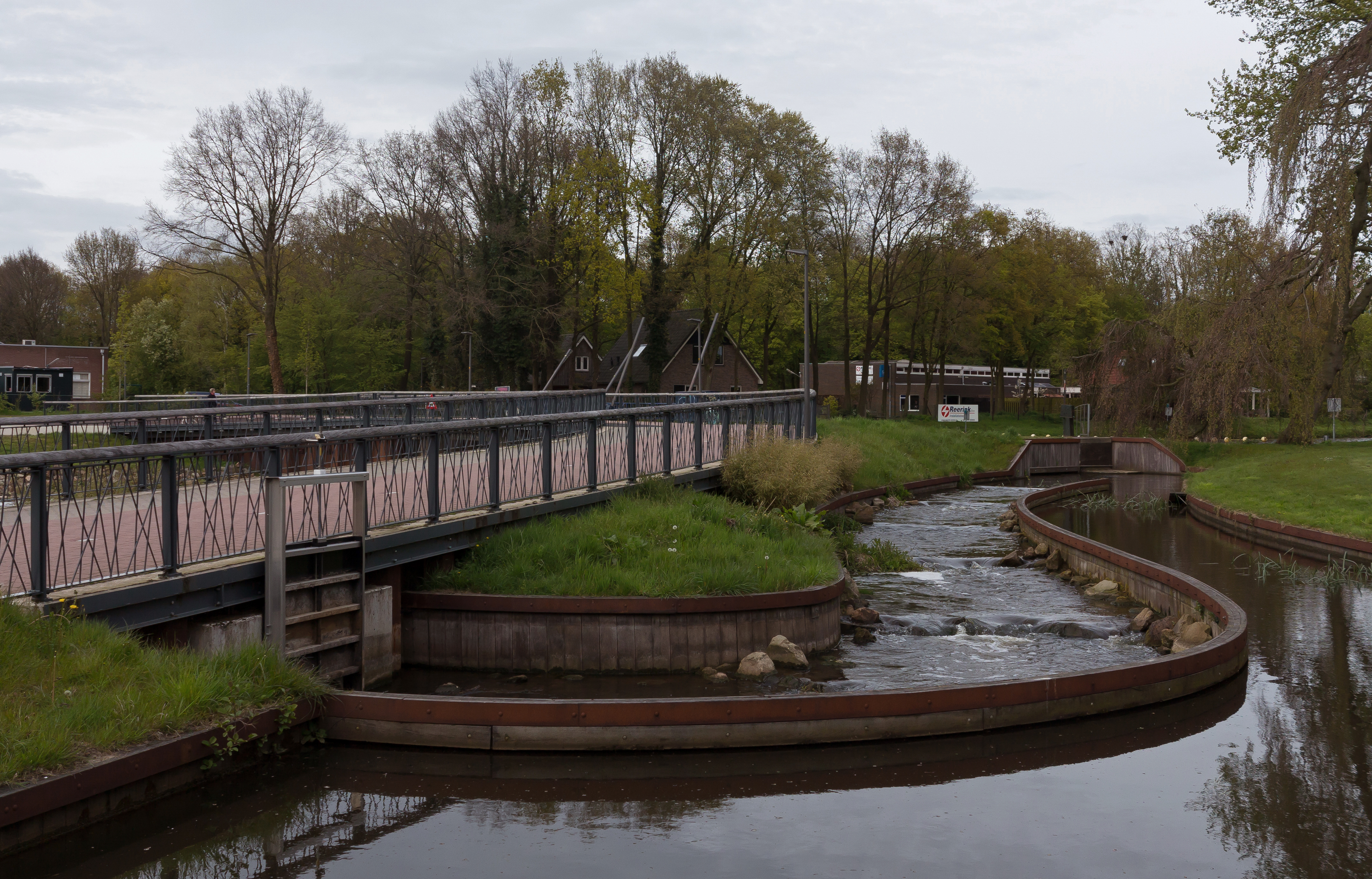
Bicycle bridge across the Berkel

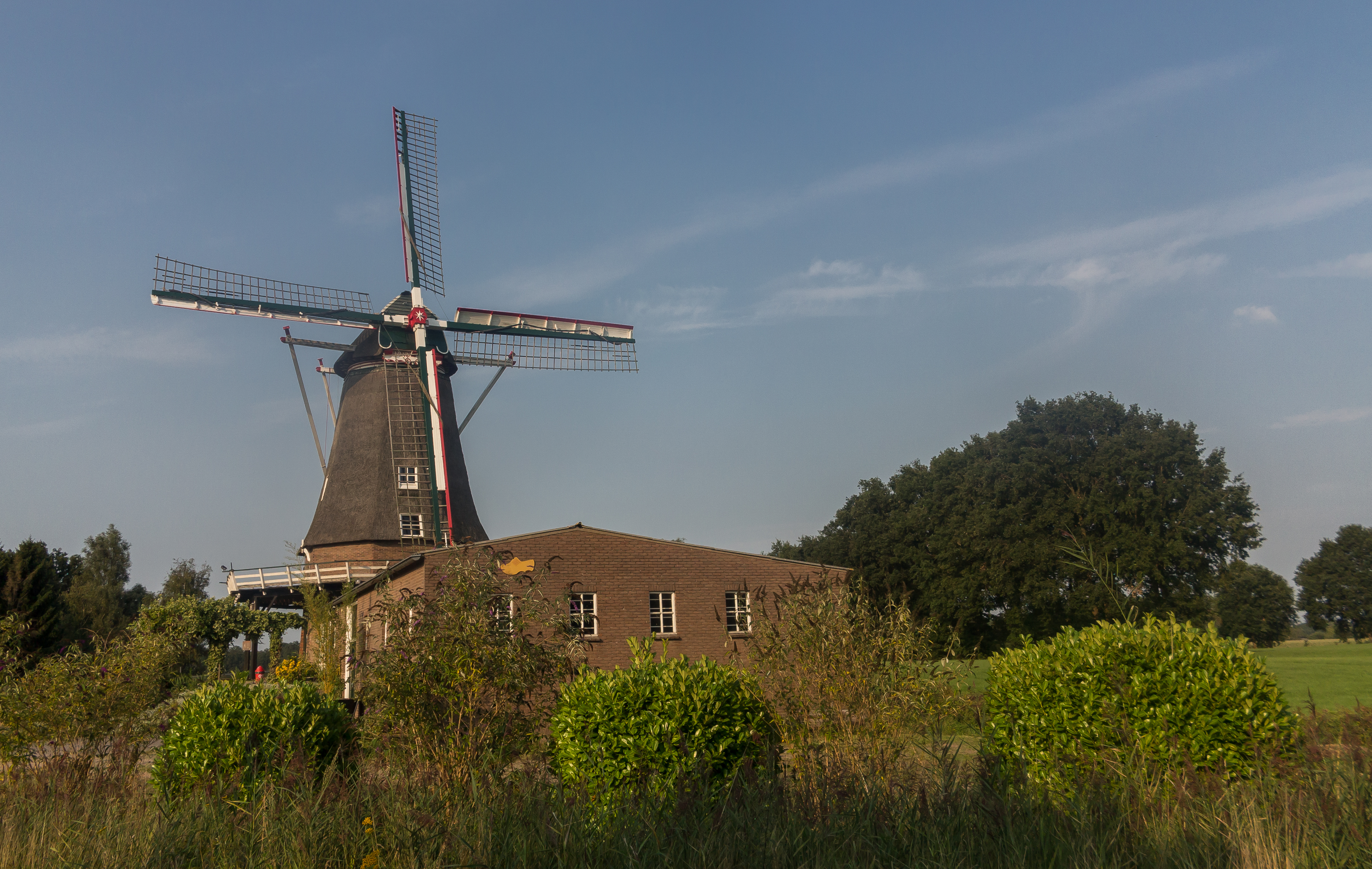
Zwiep, windmill: de Zwiepse Molen

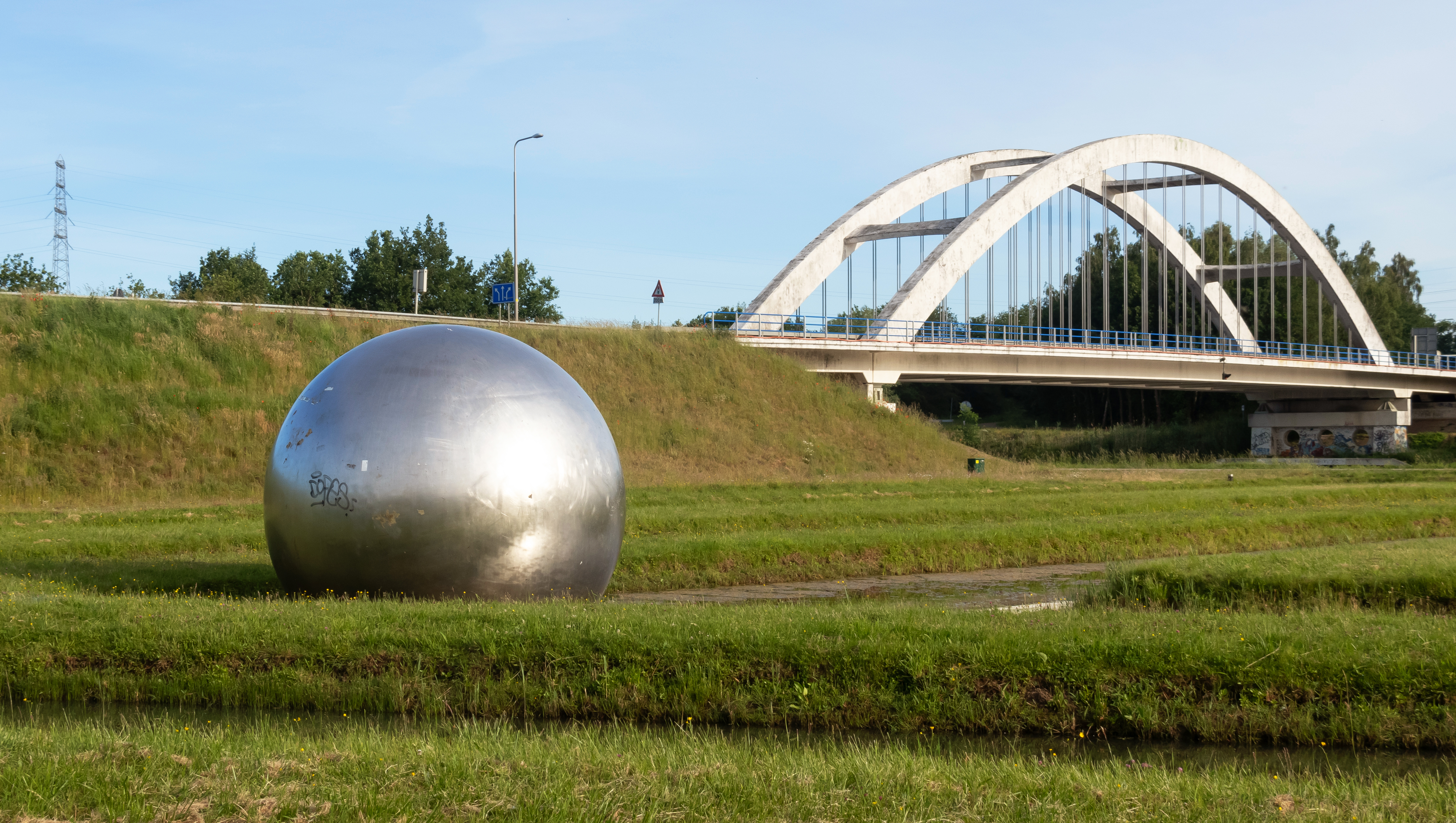
Lochem, artwork and bridge across Twentekanaal

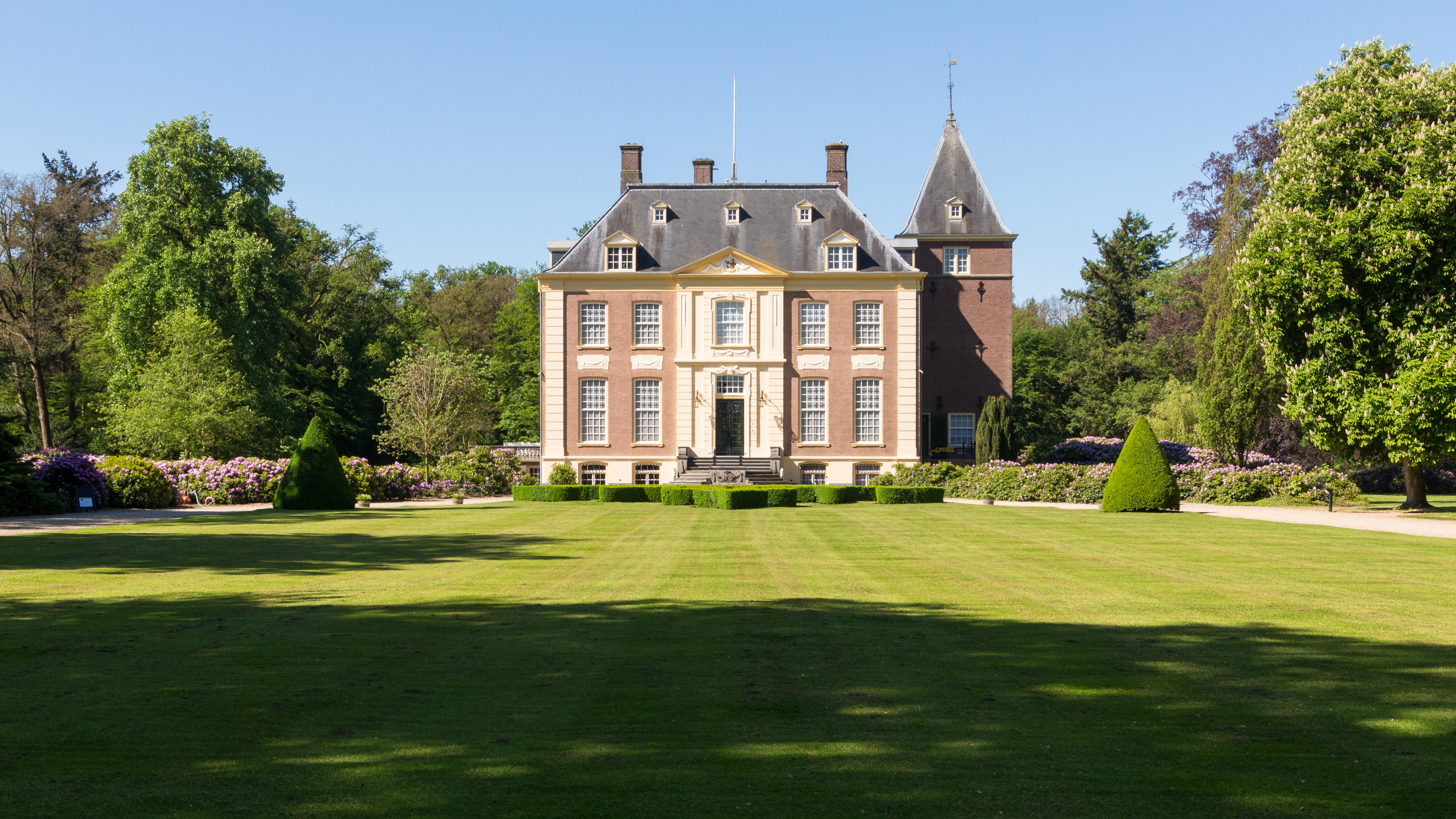
Huis Verwolde

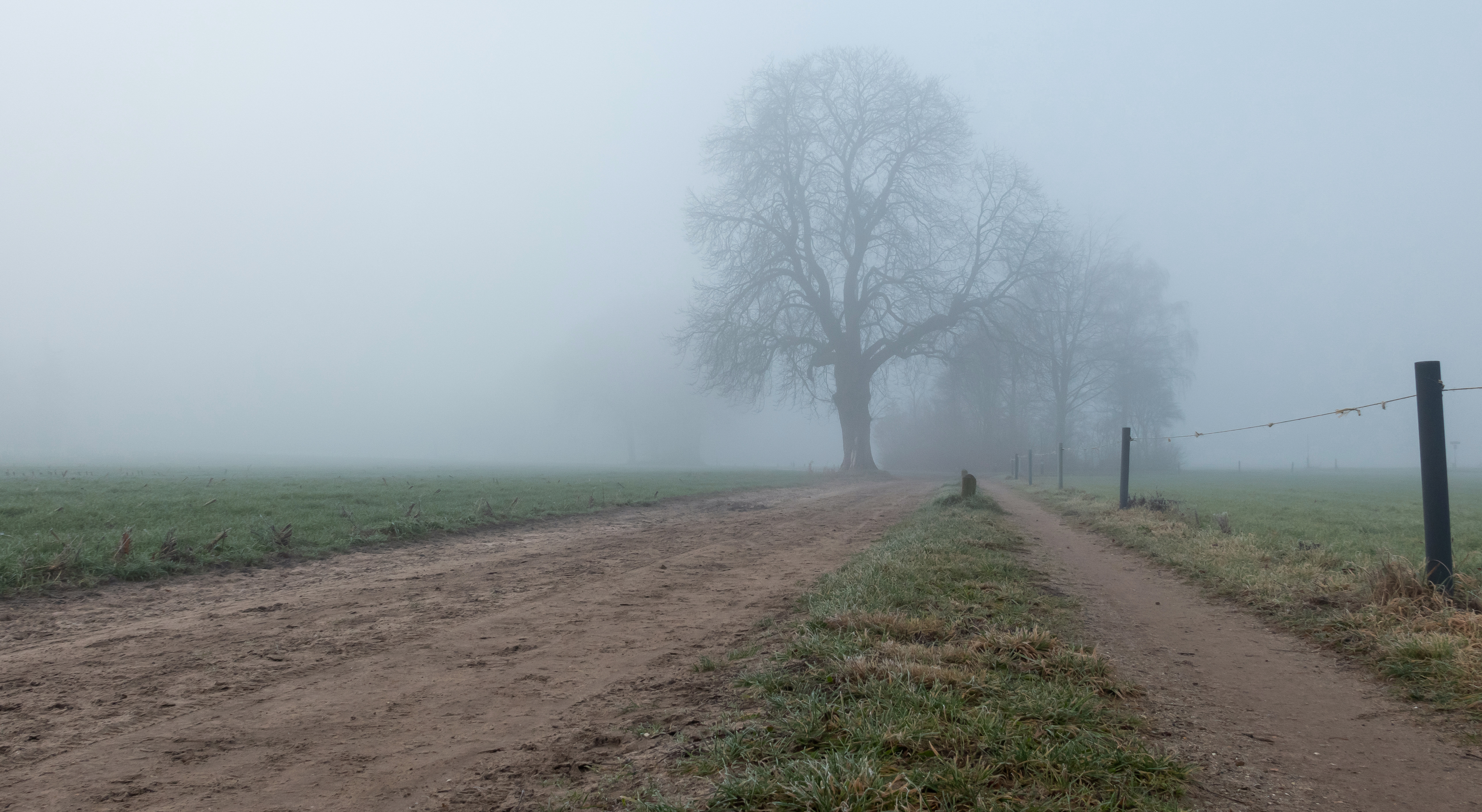
Lochemse Berg, trees in the fog on the Hoge Enk
