= 2024 in the Netherlands =

- Decades: 2000s; 2010s; 2020s
- See also: Other events of 2024; History of the Netherlands

Events from the year 2024 in the Netherlands.

== Incumbents ==
- Monarch: Willem-Alexander
- Prime Minister: Mark Rutte (until 2 July); Dick Schoof (since 2 July)
- Speaker of the House of Representatives: Martin Bosma
- President of the Senate: Jan Anthonie Bruijn

== Events ==
=== January ===
- 11 January – South Africa v. Israel (Genocide Convention): A two-day public hearing begins at the Peace Palace in The Hague regarding alleged violations by Israel of its obligations under the 1948 Genocide Convention and international law in relation to Palestinians in the Gaza Strip.
- 5–7 January – 2024 European Speed Skating Championships
- 5–13 January – 2024 Women's European Water Polo Championship
- 10–14 January – 2024 UEC European Track Championships
- 13–28 January – Tata Steel Chess Tournament 2024
- 15–21 January – 2024 IIHF World Women's U18 Championship Division II A at Heerenveen
- 26–27 January – 2024 Dutch Darts Masters

=== February ===
- 3 February – 17 March – 2024 Rugby Europe Championship
- 5 February – Former prime minister Dries van Agt dies along with his wife Eugenie following an act of medically-assisted euthanasia.
- 6 February – The Dutch owner of Yandex, a Russian multinational technology company and search engine, Yandex N.V, announces the sale of the company to a "fully-Russian owned entity" for 475 billion rubles ($5.2 billion), marking its withdrawal from the country.
- 12–18 February – 2024 ABN AMRO Open
- 21 February – 2024 Lochem bridge collapse: A bridge under construction collapses in Lochem, killing two workers and wounding two more.
- 27 February – The Marengo trial concludes after six years. Of the 17 prosecuted people three are sentenced to life imprisonment, including Ridouan Taghi and Saïd Razzouki.
- 29 February – Dutch international footballer Quincy Promes is detained in Dubai while on trip with Spartak Moscow and faces extradition to the Netherlands after having been recently convicted in absentia of drug trafficking and sentenced to six years in prison by a Dutch court.

=== March ===
- 15–17 March – 2024 World Short Track Speed Skating Championships
- 21 March – The Dutch Royal Marechaussee arrest three British soldiers of the HMS Prince of Wales after multiple incidents in Rotterdam.
- 24 March – Female darts players Anca Zijlstra and Aileen de Graaf leave the Netherlands National Team to protest a trans woman playing on the team, citing a desire to have an equal playing field.
- 30 March – In a six hour long hostage situation in Ede, over 150 people are evacuated after a man holds four people hostage in a nightclub and threatens to blow himself up. The suspect eventually releases the hostages and surrenders to police.

=== April ===
- 11 April – The Netherlands increases its military budget to two percent of its GDP for the first time since 1994.

=== May ===
- 11 May – Joost Klein, the Netherlands' contestant to the Eurovision Song Contest 2024 in Malmö, Sweden, is disqualified from the final round in disputed circumstances.
- 16 May – An agreement is reached on forming a new governing coalition composed of the VVD, NSC, the BBB, and the PVV.
- 28 May – Dick Schoof, the former Director-General of the General Intelligence and Security Service, is nominated as prime minister by the incoming coalition government.
- 29 May – One person is killed after falling inside an engine of a departing KLM aircraft at Amsterdam Schiphol Airport.

=== June ===
- 6 June – 2024 European Parliament election: The GroenLinks–PvdA alliance emerges as the largest party in the Dutch contingent to the European Parliament.
- 11 June – An agreement is reached to form a new cabinet of ministers in the incoming coalition government.
- 12 June – A court convicts three people and sentences them to between 26 and 28 years imprisonment for the murder of journalist Peter R. de Vries in 2021.
- 20 June – Outgoing Prime Minister Mark Rutte is selected to assume the NATO Secretariat for a term that begins on 2 October 2024.

=== July ===
- 2 July – Dick Schoof is sworn in as prime minister by King Willem-Alexander.
- 12 July – The Supreme Court of the Netherlands rules that same-sex marriage is legal in Aruba and Curaçao.
- 17 July – Olivier Arrindell, the leader of the Oualichi Movement for Change in Sint-Maarten, is injured in a gun attack that also kills his wife and injures a party member. A suspect is arrested.

=== August ===
- 23 August – Prime Minister Schoof announces a ban on the usage of cell phones and other mobile devices during cabinet meetings as part of efforts to reduce infiltration by spies.
- 26 August – The Dutch Data Protection Authority fines Uber €290 million (US$324 million) for allegedly breaching the European Union's General Data Protection Regulation in order to collect information on its European drivers.
- 28 August –
  - A nationwide IT outage is recorded following a network failure at the Defence Ministry.
  - The Dinner train, a company that offered luxury dinners on a moving train departing from a different city every week, declares bankruptcy.

=== September ===
- 9 September – Two Pakistani nationals, including Saad Hussain Rizvi, the leader of the Tehreek-e-Labbaik Pakistan, are convicted in absentia by a Dutch court for making death threats against Geert Wilders.
- 10 September – The Netherlands lifts all its weapon restrictions on military equipment it granted to Ukraine, allowing its army to target Russia with deep strikes while urging other nations to lift their weapon restrictions as well.
- 19 September – One person is killed and another is injured in a knife attack in Rotterdam. A suspect is arrested.
- 27 September – Authorities announce that a cyberattack on a police account likely done by a "state actor" led to the perpetrators gaining access to the work-related contact details of all members of the National Police Corps.

=== October ===
- 1 October – Mark Rutte becomes Secretary-General of NATO.
- 30 October – The Northern Netherlands District Court imposes a daily fine of 50,000 euros ($54,000) on the Central Agency for the Reception of Asylum Seekers for failing to reduce overcrowding in a migrant reception center in Ter Apel that houses more 2,000 people.

=== November ===
- 1 November –
  - Junior finance minister Folkert Idsinga resigns amid criticism over his refusal to disclose details of his personal shareholdings and other investments.
  - Two silk screens by Andy Warhol are stolen while two others are destroyed during a break-in at the MPV Gallery in Oisterwijk, North Brabant. One suspect is arrested.
- 7 November – Several Israeli nationals are injured in a series of attacks in Amsterdam during a Europa League match between Ajax and Maccabi Tel Aviv.
- 12 November – The Hague Court of Appeal overturns a 2021 ruling that required Shell plc to reduce its carbon emissions by 45% following an appeal.
- 15 November – Nora Achahbar resigns as State Secretary for Benefits and Customs in protest over racist remarks made by members of the governing coalition during a cabinet meeting following the November 2024 Amsterdam riots.

=== December ===
- 7 December – Six people are killed after an explosion causes the collapse of a three-storey building in The Hague.
- 11 December – A woman who was repatriated from Syria after travelling there and marrying an Islamic State militant is convicted of enslaving a Yazidi woman who was taken to Syria after being abducted by Islamic State in Iraq and is sentenced to ten years' imprisonment.
- 12 December – The Miss Nederland pageant is discontinued after 35 years.

== Art and entertainment ==
- List of Dutch submissions for the Academy Award for Best International Feature Film
- 53rd International Film Festival Rotterdam

== Holidays ==
- 1 January – New Year's Day
- 29 March – Good Friday
- 31 March – Easter Sunday
- 1 April – Easter Monday
- 27 April – King's Day
- 5 May – Liberation Day
- 9 May – Ascension Day
- 19–20 May – Pentecost
- 25 December – Christmas Day
- 26 December – Boxing Day

== Deaths ==
- 1 January – André Hissink, 104, World War II veteran (No. 320 Squadron).
- 1 January – Hans Sleeswijk, 88, Olympic sailor (1960).
- 26 January – Gerrit van Kouwen, 60, Formula Ford driver, winner of Formula Ford Festival (1984) and Formula Ford EuroCup (1983).
- 30 January – Jan de Rooy, 80, rally driver, winner of Dakar Rally (1987) and Africa Eco Race (2009)
- 4 February – Hélène Egger, 95, Holocaust survivor.
- 26 April – Wim Kozijn, 83, mayor of 's-Graveland (1987–2002)
- 12 July – Ellis Brandon, 101, WW2 veteran.
- 12 July – Tonke Dragt, 93, children's author (The Letter for the King) and illustrator.
- 6 October – Johan Neeskens, 73, football player (FC Barcelona) and manager (national team)

== See also ==
- 2024 in the European Union
- 2024 in Europe
