= 2026 in the Netherlands =

- Decades: 2000s; 2010s; 2020s
- See also: Other events of 2026; History of the Netherlands

Picture of the Netherlands taken during ISS Expedition 74

Events from the year 2026 in the Netherlands.

== Incumbents ==
- Monarch: Willem-Alexander
- Prime Minister: Dick Schoof (until 23 February); Rob Jetten (since 23 February)

== Events ==
=== January ===
- 1 January –
  - During the night of New Year's Day, a fire razes the Vondelkerk church tower in Amsterdam.
  - New Year's celebrations lead to widespread disorder nationwide, with petrol bombs thrown at police in Breda and 14 people sustaining eye injuries in Rotterdam. Two men die in fireworks incidents in Nijmegen and Aalsmeer.
- 2–9 January –
  - Severe winter weather bring snow and ice across much of the country, prompting KNMI code orange warnings for dangerous travel conditions and causing widespread disruption to transport nationwide.
  - At Amsterdam Airport Schiphol, hundreds of flights are cancelled over several days due to snow-covered runways and deicing constraints, including around 450 cancellations on 5 January alone.
  - NS services are affected by weather conditions and temporarily shut down on 6 January after snow and frozen railroad switches make operations unsafe, with services gradually resuming later that day.
- 8–9 January – Storm Goretti brings strong wind gusts across the country and causes heavy snow in the provinces of Friesland, Groningen, Drenthe and on the West Frisian Islands.
- 15 January – Four people are injured in an explosion that destroys several buildings in the historic centre of Utrecht.
- 20 January – Seven members of the House of Representatives led by Gidi Markuszower defect from the PVV and form the Markuszower Group.
- 27 January – The Overijssel District Court sentences an Eritrean national to 20 years' imprisonment for leading a criminal network that trafficked migrants across the Mediterranean from Libya and subjected them to abuse and extortion upon arrival in the Netherlands.

=== February ===
- 6 February – The Netherlands returns a 3,500-year-old Ancient Egyptian sculpture to Egypt after a Dutch investigation confirmed the artefact, which surfaced at an art fair in Maastricht, had been looted and unlawfully removed during the 2011 Egyptian revolution.
- 6–22 February – Netherlands at the 2026 Winter Olympics
- 23 February – Rob Jetten is inaugurated as prime minister.

=== March ===
- 5 March – The Royal Netherlands Navy joins the European naval task force in defending Cyprus against Iranian missile strikes.
- 5–8 March – 2026 World Allround Speed Skating Championships at Thialf in Heerenveen.
- 12 March – Iceland and the Netherlands announce they will both intervene on the side of South Africa in the International Court of Justice's genocide case against Israel.
- 13 March – A suspected arson attack is carried out on a synagogue in Rotterdam.
- 14 March –
  - A magnitude 3.0 earthquake strikes Drenthe, near Geelbroek.
  - An explosion lightly damages a Jewish school in Amsterdam, with no injuries reported.
- 16 March – An explosion causes a fire at an office building in Zuidas, with no reported injuries.
- 18 March – 2026 Dutch municipal elections
- 22 March – Between 200 and 300 demonstrators gather in Amsterdam, to protest against the war and the Iranian government.
- 25 March – Under the St Peter and Paul Church in Maastricht, the remains of legendary French musketeer d'Artagnan are believed to be found.

=== April ===
- 2 April – Suspects in the 2025 Drents Museum heist return three of four stolen artefacts, including the Helmet of Coțofenești.
- 29 April – Multiple wildfires are active throughout the country, with most notably the fire near 't Harde on the Veluwe.

=== May ===
- 6 May – Following the MV Hondius hantavirus outbreak in which several Dutch people have died, multiple patients arrive in the Netherlands for treatment and evaluation.
- 7 May – A man is arrested on suspicion of carrying out a bomb attack on the D66 party headquarters in The Hague.

=== June ===
- 4 June – Police announce the arrest of four people on suspicion of drugging and sexually abusing female acquaintances and sharing videos of the incidents online.
- 5 June – The Northern Netherlands District Court sentences three people to 47 months' imprisonment for the theft of the Helmet of Coțofenești during the 2025 Drents Museum heist.
- 11 June – A car hits a group of cyclists on a school camping trip near Vogelwaarde; three people die and four others are injured.
- 11 June–19 July – The Netherlands participates at the 2026 FIFA World Cup.
- 15 June – A court in The Hague sentences a Syrian asylum-seeker to 26 years' imprisonment for the torture and rape of imprisoned opponents of the regime of Bashar al-Assad during the Syrian Civil War.

=== August ===
- 13 August –
  - One person dies and several others are injured in an explosion at the Port of Rotterdam.
  - Ukraine repatriates the remains of nationalist leader Yevhen Konovalets from Crooswijk General Cemetery in Rotterdam for an official reburial in Kyiv.
- 14–30 August – 2026 Mens and Women's FIH Hockey World Cup in Wavre, Belgium and Amstelveen, Netherlands.
- 28 August – A court in The Hague sentences a Rwandan-born man to life imprisonment for war crimes and crimes against humanity committed during the Rwandan Genocide in 1994.

=== September ===
- 12 September – Death of Alfredo Goeloe during an arrest by the police in Rotterdam-Zuid, leading to protests against police brutality.
- 15 September – Multiple pipes are discovered on rail tracks across the country in a suspected act of sabotage, causing widespread disruptions to transportation.
- 22 September – A ban on the entry of any goods, including those brought in by private travelers, from Israeli settlements in the West Bank or the Golan Heights comes into effect. Israeli Foreign Minister Gideon Sa'ar announces that Israel will revoke diplomatic privileges and Israel-issued credentials of Dutch diplomats in Ramallah in response.
- 23 September – The Netherlands ceases its Eurovision boycott over Israel's participation and says it would compete in 2027, citing new regulations preventing conflict-hit nations from hosting even if they win, as well as new voting rules.

=== October ===
- 12 October – Authorities ban Hapoel Be'er Sheva F.C. fans from attending the team's Europa League match against AZ Alkmaar in Alkmaar, citing security concerns over potential demonstrations and clashes between Israeli fans and protestors.
- 27 October – The Netherlands withdraws from next year's Eurovision Song Contest, citing "sensitivities" over Israel's participation.

=== November ===
- 2 November – A cyberattack is carried out on refrigeration systems of supermarkets across seven European countries including the Netherlands, resulting in financial losses caused by food spoilage.
- 6 November – Following mid-air threat communications, a KLM flight from Prague is searched and isolated at Schiphol Airport under high-alert procedures.
- 9 November – Israel Weapon Industries and Artillerie Inrichtingen Armaments announce that they will set up a facility in the country to produce IWI guns.

== Holidays ==
- 1 January – New Year's Day
- 3 April – Good Friday
- 5 April – Easter Sunday
- 6 April – Easter Monday
- 27 April – King's Day
- 5 May – Liberation Day
- 14 May – Ascension Day
- 24–25 June – Pentecost
- 25 December – Christmas Day
- 26 December – Boxing Day

== Deaths ==
- 5 January –
  - Ad van Kempen, 81, actor (1-900, 'n Beetje Verliefd, Winter in Wartime).
  - Elsje de Wijn, 82, actress (Frank en Eva, For a Lost Soldier, Baantjer).
- 8 January – Astrid Roemer, 78, author.
- 11 January – Herman Wouters, 85, politician, mayor of Grobbendonk (1989–1997).
- 13 January – Annemarie Prins, 93, actress (Îles flottantes, Code Blue, Accused).
- 15 January – Robert Jensen, 52, television and radio presenter.
- 11 February – Cees Nooteboom, 92, novelist (Rituals, The Following Story, All Souls' Day), poet and journalist.
- 14 February – Tom Van der Bruggen, 80, inventor.
- 20 February – Femke Boersma, 90, actress (Het Wonderlijke leven van Willem Parel, Pastorale 1943).
- 21 February – Koos Postema, 93, radio and television presenter.
- 1 March – Yukkie B, 56, rapper.
- 25 March – Esther Roord, 61, actress (Kees and Co).
- 12 April – Sonja Barend, 86, television personality.
- 24 April – Jade Kops, 19, social media influencer and cancer activist.
- 25 April – Greet Prins, 72, politician, member of the Senate (2019–2026).
- 26 April – Dick Matena, 83, comic writer and cartoonist.
- 8 May – Karin Spaink, 68, journalist, writer, and feminist.
- 15 May – Bas Westerweel, 62, radio and television presenter (Het Klokhuis).
- 3 June – Lieke Marsman, 35, poet.
- July – Rob Dieperink, 38, football referee
- 6 September – Guus Kouwenhoven, 84, arms dealer
- 14 September – Tara Singh Varma, 78, MP (1994–2001)
- 15 September – Ben Saunders, 43, English-born singer (Follow That Dream)
- 30 September – Paulien Cornelisse, 50, writer and comedian
- 21 October – Romano Hummel, 27, speedway rider (Berwick Bandits).
- 25 October – Rudi Fuchs, 84, art historian and museum curator.

== See also ==
- 2026 in the European Union
- 2026 in Europe
