= 2025 in the Netherlands =

- Decades: 2000s; 2010s; 2020s
- See also: Other events of 2025; History of the Netherlands

Events from the year 2025 in the Netherlands.

== Incumbents ==
- Monarch: Willem-Alexander
- Prime Minister: Dick Schoof

== Events ==
=== January ===
- 22 January – The District Court of The Hague orders the government to meet its own goals for reducing overall nitrogen emissions by 2030 or pay a 10 million euro ($10.4 million) fine to Greenpeace.
- 25 January – The Dacian-era Helmet of Coțofenești, on loan from the National History Museum of Romania, is stolen along with three other gold artifacts from the Drents Museum in Assen by thieves who break into the museum using explosives.

=== February ===
- 19 February – The Netherlands agrees to repatriate 119 artefacts from the National Museum of Ethnology in Leiden, including some of the Benin Bronzes, to Nigeria. They are officially turned over on 19 June.
- 21 February – A medical student identified as Fouad Lakhlili is sentenced to life imprisonment for killing three people in the 2023 Rotterdam shootings.

=== March ===
- 6 March – Around 10 structures are destroyed in a fire in Arnhem.
- 16 March – The historic Wilhelminatoren collapses in Valkenburg aan de Geul.
- 27 March – 2025 Amsterdam stabbing attack: A Ukrainian national injures five people in the Sint Nicolaasstraat area in the vicinity of Dam Square in central Amsterdam.
- 31 March – The Caribbean guilder replaces the Netherlands Antillean guilder as the currency for Curaçao and Sint Maarten.

=== April ===
- 18 April – Pieter Omtzigt, the leader of the New Social Contract party, announces his retirement from the governing coalition and politics altogether, citing burnout.

=== May ===
- 17 May – The Netherlands' Claude finishes in 12th place at Eurovision 2025 in Switzerland with the single "C'est la vie".
- 18 May – PSV Eindhoven wins the 2024–25 Eredivisie after defeating Sparta Rotterdam 3-1 in the final.

=== June ===
- 3 June – The Party for Freedom led by Geert Wilders withdraws from the Schoof cabinet after failing to come to an agreement with coalition partners over amending the country's asylum rules, prompting the resignation of prime minister Dick Schoof and a general election.
- 12 June – The Labour Party and GroenLinks agree to participate with one shared candidate list again, and to merge their parties in 2026.
- 23 June – A cyberattack linked to the 2025 The Hague NATO summit and blamed on the pro-Russian hacker group Noname057(16) is conducted on several municipalities and organizations nationwide.
- 24–25 June – 2025 The Hague NATO summit

=== July ===
- 16 July – One person is injured in a stabbing at a cultural center in Alblasserdam, resulting in three arrests.
- 28 July – The government bars Israeli National Security Minister Itamar Ben Gvir and Finance Minister Bezalel Smotrich from entering the country over their role in human rights violations against Palestinians.

=== August ===
- 20 August – Killing of Lisa from Abcoude
- 22 August – Caspar Veldkamp resigns as foreign minister after failing to win support in the ruling coalition to impose sanctions on Israel over its conduct in the Gaza war, triggering the resignation of other ministers from his New Social Contract party.

=== September ===
- 12 September – Five schools in Beverwijk and Heemskerk are ordered closed following instances of violence between two youth groups.
- 20 September – Thirty people are arrested while two police officers are injured following clashes between police and far-right, anti-immigration protesters in The Hague.
- 26 September – Authorities announce the detention of two teenagers on suspicion of spying for pro-Russian hackers.

=== October ===
- 12 October – The government invokes the Goods Availability Act to take over the Chinese-owned semiconductor firm Nexperia based in Nijmegen. The takeover is suspended on 19 November following negotiations with China.
- 20 October – Around 230 SSC Napoli fans are arrested in Eindhoven on charges of "challenging behavior" ahead of a UEFA Champions League match against PSV Eindhoven at Philips Stadion.
- 29 October – 2025 Dutch general election: Both Democrats 66 and the PVV win a plurality of 26 seats each in the House of Representatives.
- 31 October – A passenger train collides with a truck at a railroad crossing near Meteren, injuring five people on the train.

=== November ===
- 8 November – The Netherlands finish second at the 2025 FIFA U-17 Women's World Cup after losing to North Korea 3–0 at the final in Rabat, Morocco. It is the Netherlands' first appearance at the FIFA U-17 Women's World Cup.
- 14 November – A magnitude 3.2 earthquake hits Groningen Province, damaging at least 1,077 homes.
- 17 November – The Netherlands qualify for the 2026 FIFA World Cup after defeating Lithuania 4-0 at the 2026 FIFA World Cup qualification in Amsterdam.
- 18 November – 2025 Speaker of the Dutch House of Representatives election: Incumbent Speaker Martin Bosma (PVV) loses reelection to Thom van Campen of the VVD.
- 22 November –
  - The Netherlands Armed Forces open fire on unidentified drones seen flying near Volkel Air Base.
  - Unidentified drones are seen flying near Eindhoven Airport, forcing a suspension of operations.
- 27 November–14 December – 2025 World Women's Handball Championship in Germany and the Netherlands

=== December ===
- 2 December – Indonesia and the Netherlands sign an agreement to repatriate two Dutch nationals imprisoned for drug trafficking, one of whom is on death row. The repatriation is concluded on 8 December.
- 4 December – The Netherlands, Ireland, Slovenia and Spain declare a boycott of Eurovision 2026 in response to the European Broadcasting Union's decision to allow Israel to participate in the contest.
- 22 December – A woman drives a car into a crowd at a parade in Nunspeet, Gelderland, injuring nine people, including three seriously. The driver is detained at the scene.
- 24 December – Kidane Zekarias Habtemariam, an Eritrean national wanted internationally on suspicion of leading a criminal network targeting migrants to Europe with human trafficking and extortion, is extradited to the Netherlands.

== Holidays ==
- 1 January – New Year's Day
- 18 April – Good Friday
- 20 April – Easter Sunday
- 21 April – Easter Monday
- 27 April – King's Day
- 5 May – Liberation Day
- 29 May – Ascension Day
- 8–9 June – Pentecost
- 25 December – Christmas Day
- 26 December – Boxing Day

== Arts and entertainment ==
- 54th International Film Festival Rotterdam

== Deaths ==
- 7 June – Luis Jalandoni, 90, Filipino-born Roman Catholic priest and rebel, co-founder of the NDFP and Christians for National Liberation.
- 31 July – Derk Sauer, 72, journalist and media proprietor, founder of The Moscow Times
- 14 August – Ingeborg Elzevier, 89, actress (The Dress, Grimm).
- 23 September – Coby Timp, 95, actress.
- 20 October – Selma van de Perre, 103, World War II resistance fighter.
- 12 December – Paul de Nooijer, 82, photographer and filmmaker.
- 25 December – Geeske Krol-Benedictus, 94, politician and Frisian cultural activist.

== See also ==
- 2025 in the European Union
- 2025 in Europe
