= 1961 Kandy museum robbery =

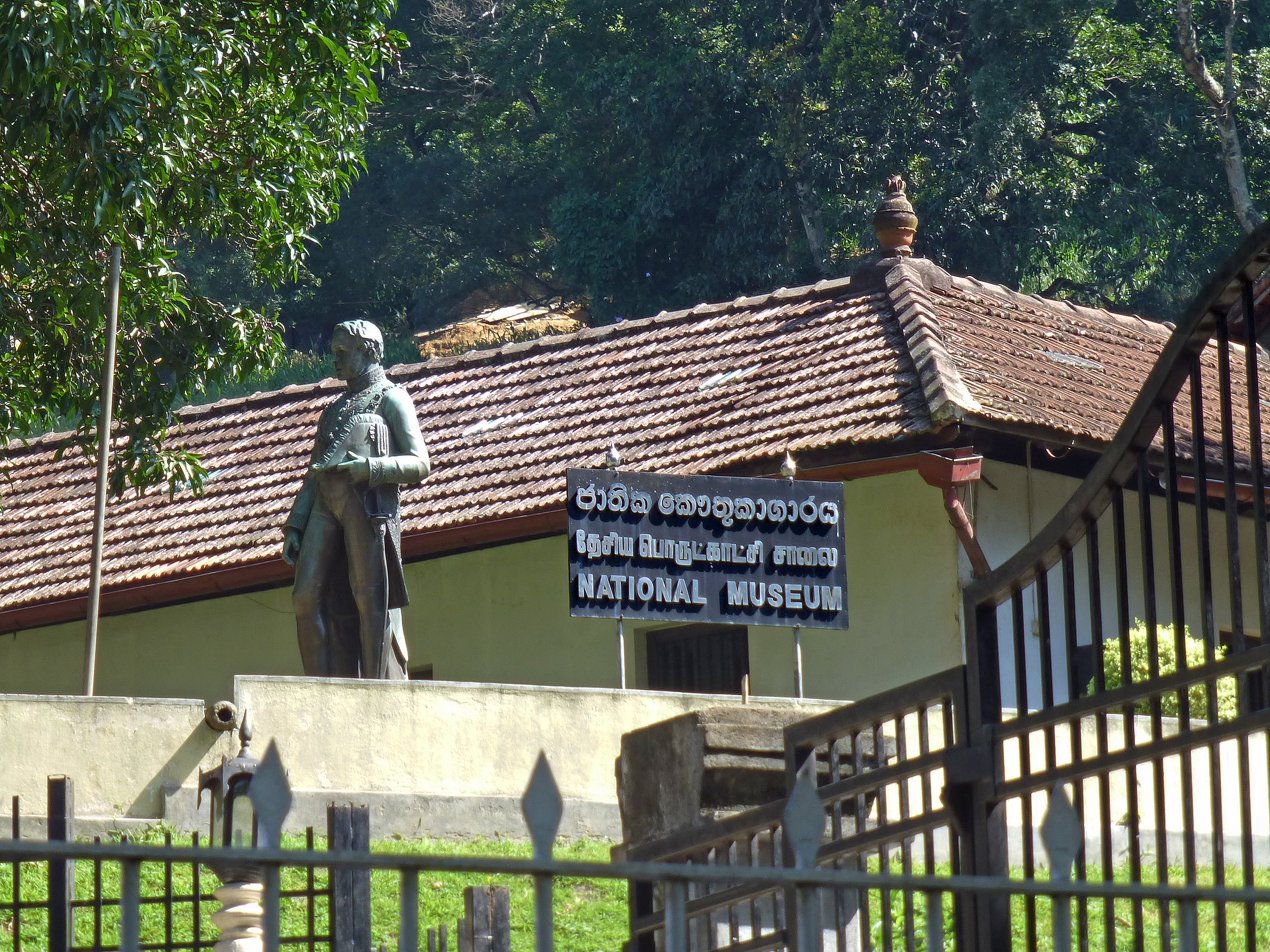
- Kandy National Museum
- Date: 18 September 1961
- Time: ( )
- Venue: National Museum of Kandy
- Location: Kandy, Sri Lanka
- Type: Jewellery theft

On 18 September 1961, a thief stole Royal Crown of King Rajasinghe II from the National Museum of Kandy. Subsequent Police CID investigation led by Inspector Rodney Kithulegoda resulted in the arrest of two ex-convicts, Kirthipala and L.E. Perera, in October 1961. Investigations revealed that Kirthipala had stolen the crown from the museum on the night of 18 September by entering the main gallery from the wooden roof undetected by the night watchmen. He met L.E. Perera the following day in Kelaniya, where they removed the precious stones and cut the crown into pieces to smelt the gold, which was used to forge gold coins and rings, which had been sold. Kirthipala and L.E. Perera were convicted of the crime and sentenced to prison, where both would die serving their sentence. The Crown had recently been moved to the Kandy National Museum on the request of the Department of Archaeology for safekeeping from the Dodanwela Devale where it was kept since it was gifted by Rajasinghe II following his success at the Battle of Gannoruwa. A replica of the crown was created from Silver for the display at the National Museum of Kandy.

== See also ==
- 2012 Colombo museum robbery
- 2025 Louvre robbery
- 2025 Drents Museum heist – Theft of artifacts in Assen, Netherlands
- Dresden Green Vault burglary – 2019 jewellery theft in Germany
- Vincenzo Peruggia § Theft
