= Staged photography =

Form of photography

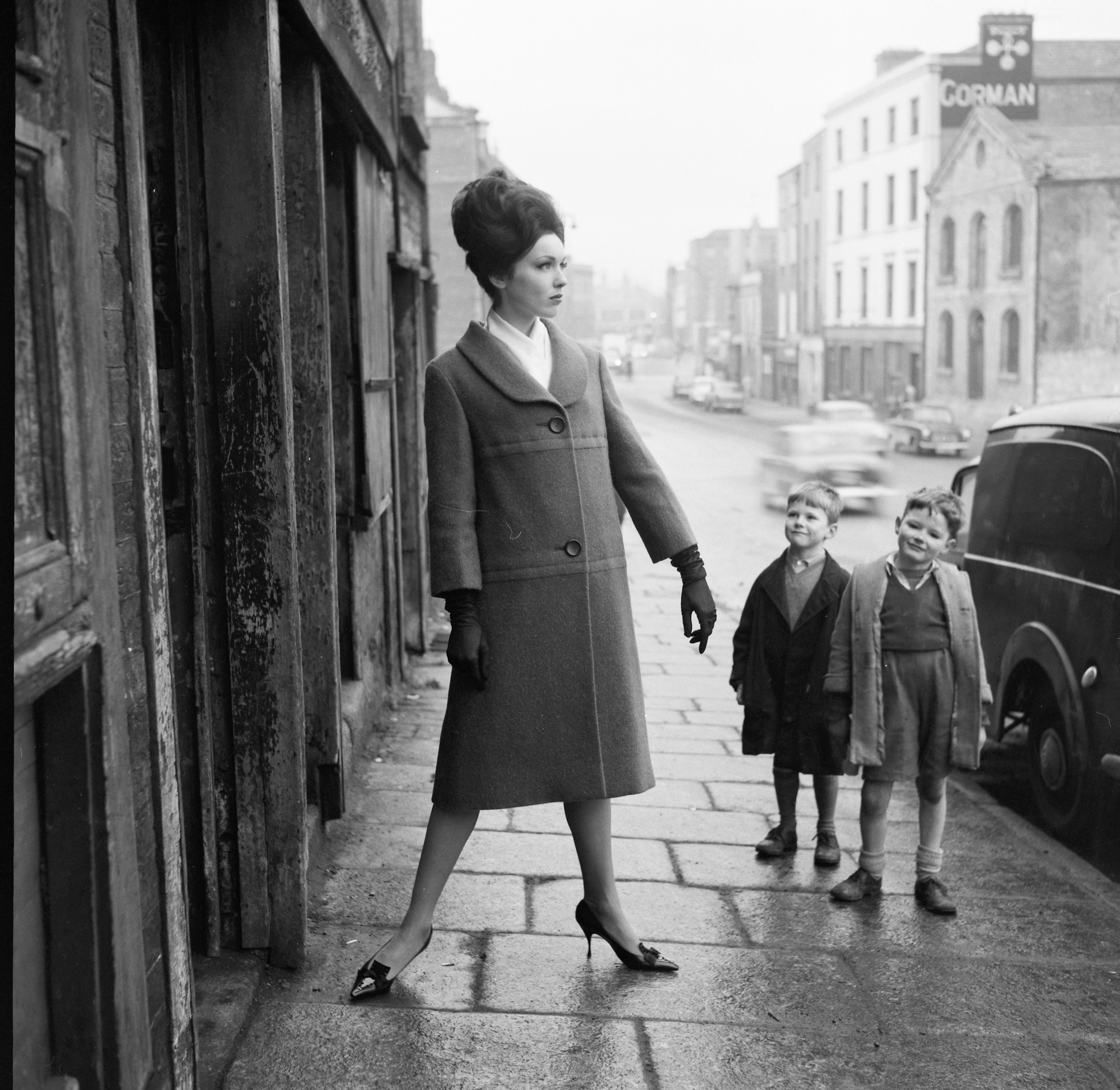
A girl can never have too many admirers!, photo by Colman Doyle.

Staged photography is a form of photography where the photographer, like a director, stages everything in advance to have full control over how their idea is visualized. Although the staging of a photograph was already common in the early days of photography, it was not distinguished as a separate genre until the 1980s, when some photographers began to establish themselves as conceptual artists.

In contrast to, for example, candid shots or street photography, in staged photography, little is left to chance. The photographer's role is also not that of an objective observer who documents what is happening around him. After all, according to this view, a photo is not a realistic representation of a fleeting moment, but a creation of the photographer's imagination; the photographer tries to create a new reality with his work. Post-processing also plays an important role in the creation of a conceptual photo. For example, elements of different images can be superimposed and next to each other. Practitioners of this genre often work in a studio, or seek out a special location to take their photos.

== History ==
American critic A. D. Coleman proposed the term directorial mode attempting to define the emerging genre in his 1976 article for Artforum magazine. The term staged photography was introduced in 1987 in two publications: Andy Grundberg's and Kathleen McCarthy Gauss' Photography and Art. Interactions since 1946 and Anne H. Hoy's Fabrications. Staged, Altered, and Appropriated Photographs.

Today the term is often used as a hyperonym for such picture-making (as opposed to picture-taking) concepts as fabricated, manipulated, creative, constructed, arranged, directorial, and tableau photography.

In the Netherlands, staged photography started in the 1980s with theatrical still lifes created in the studio. The exhibitions Staged Photo Events (1982) in the Lijnbaan Center in Rotterdam and Fotografia Buffa (1986) in the Groninger Museum were influential. Well-known Dutch photographers who practice this genre are Rommert Boonstra, co-founder of the Rotterdam School, Teun Hocks, Pieter Laurens Mol, Paul de Nooijer and Erwin Olaf.

Other representatives of staged photography are Philip-Lorca diCorcia, Jeff Wall, Bruce Charlesworth, Tono Stano, Nanna Bisp Büchert, Lis Steincke, and Joel-Peter Witkin.

== See also ==
- Conceptual photography
- Theatre photography
