= Hague explosion =

Hague explosion may refer to:

- 2024 The Hague explosion, a major explosion in the Mariahoeve en Marlot neighborhood of The Hague, Netherlands, on December 7, 2024.
- Hague Street explosion, an exploding boiler at a printing press manufacturer on February 4, 1850, in New York City.
