= 2012 Colombo museum robbery =

Museum robbery in Sri Lanka

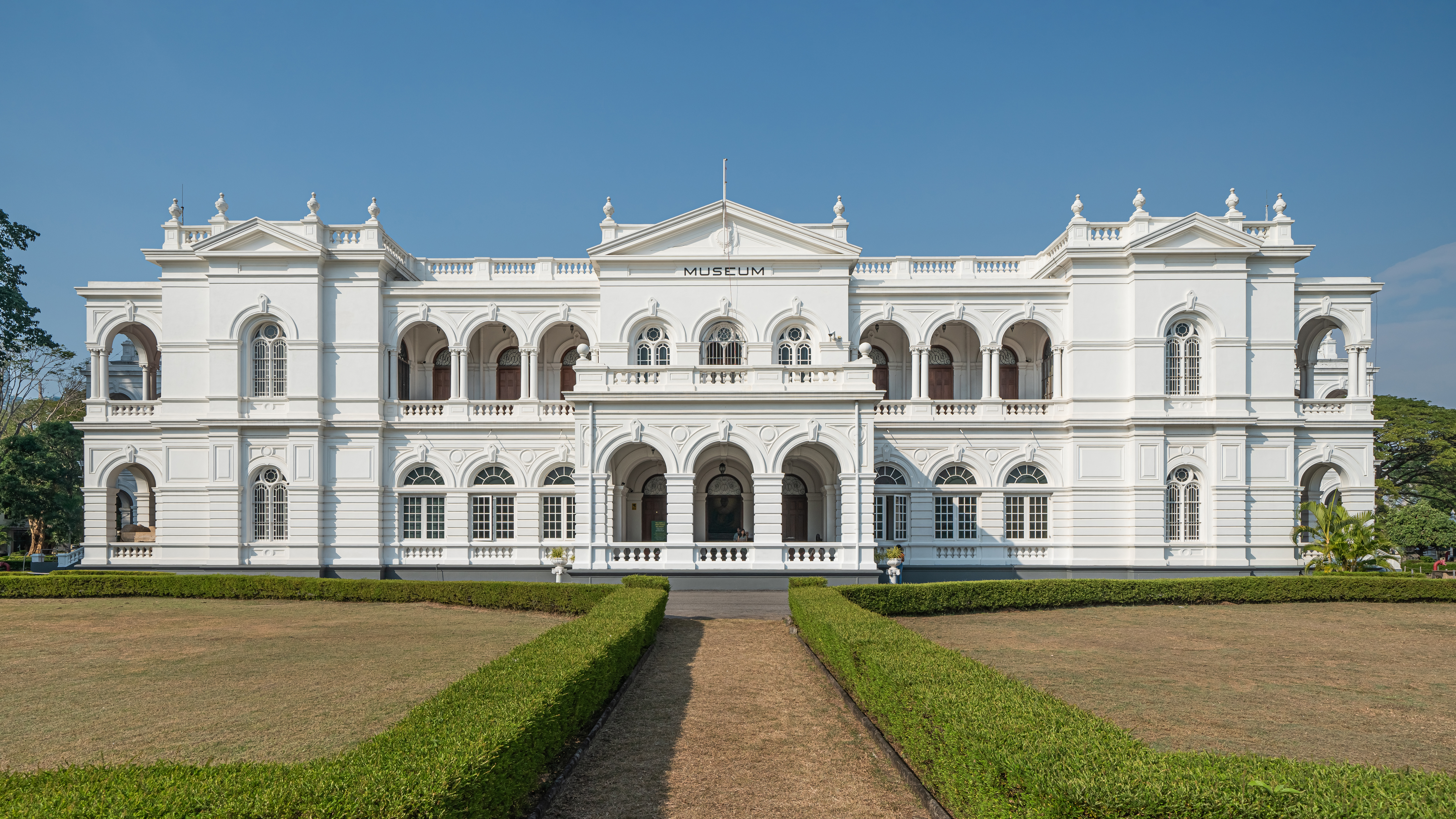
- Colombo National Museum
- Date: 16 March 2012,
- Time: ( )
- Venue: National Museum of Colombo
- Location: Colombo, Sri Lanka
- Type: Coin and sword theft

On 16 March 2012, a thief stole artefacts worth Rs. 4.4 million (in 2012) from the National Museum of Colombo. A thief broke into the first floor and stole 10 gold plated swords, 93 gold coins, a ring, walking sticks from the Kandyan Kindgom, 18 silver rings, 50 silver coins, nine lead coins, and 34 currency notes. Police CID investigation and a Ministry of National Heritage committee report found that on the day of the robbery, there were two night watchmen and a supervisor, and that the museum CCTV was not operational. CID arrested two women and a three-wheeler driver, and then another suspect named Lansage Priyantha Mendis alias “Kangatta” in October 2012, and several artefacts were recovered. Kangatta was held in remand custody for five years until he was released on bail and disappeared thereafter.

== See also ==
- 1961 Kandy museum robbery
- 2025 Louvre robbery
- 2025 Drents Museum heist – Theft of artifacts in Assen, Netherlands
- Dresden Green Vault burglary – 2019 jewellery theft in Germany
- Vincenzo Peruggia § Theft
