= Dinner train =

Railway service focused on catering

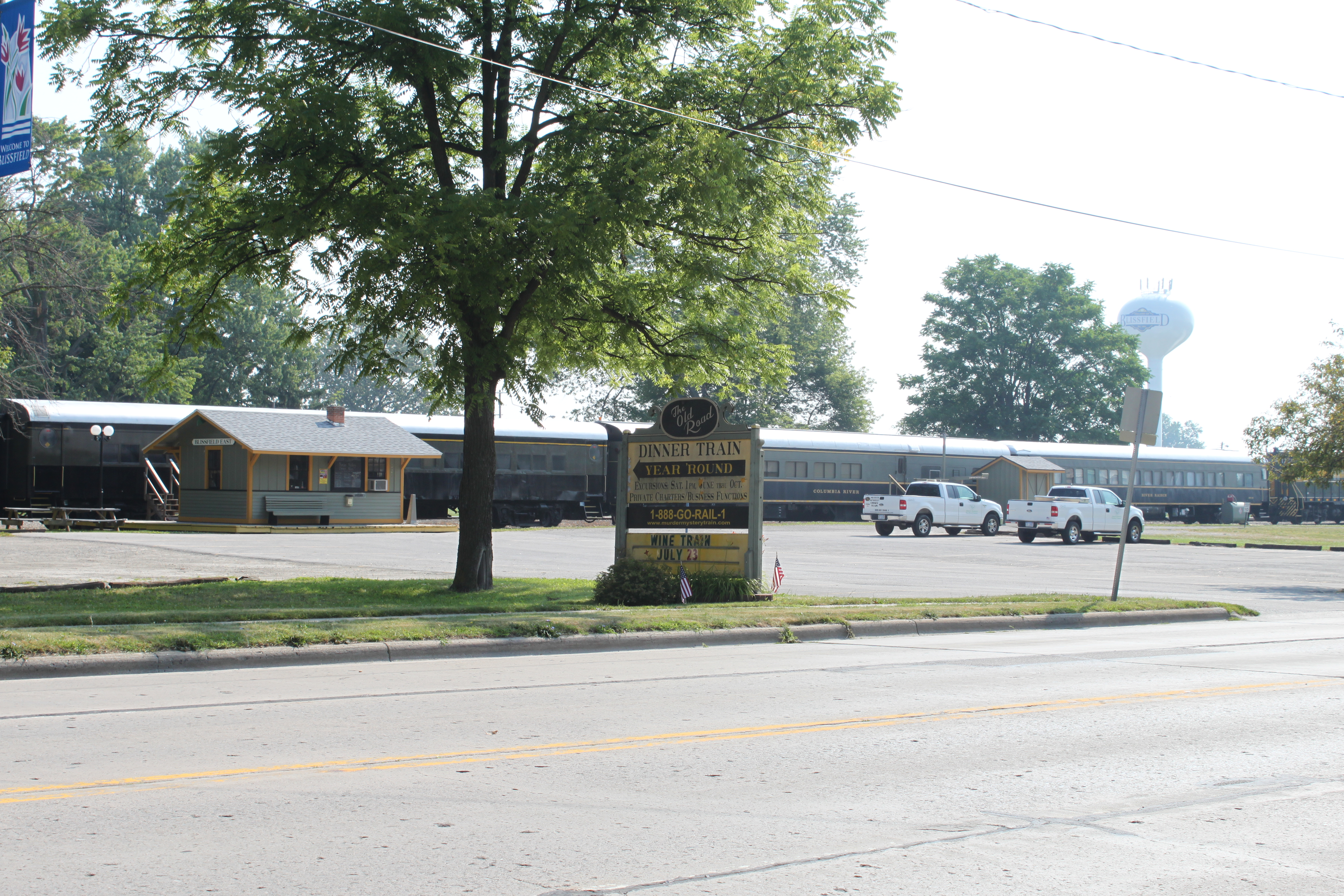
The Old Road dinner train, Blissfield, Michigan

A dinner train is a relatively new type of tourist train service whose main purpose is to allow people to eat dinner while experiencing a relatively short, leisurely round trip train ride. This contrasts with conventional passenger trains, whose main purpose is to transport passengers to some destination as quickly as possible but which also might serve dinner on long-distance routes.

Dinner trains have become popular in recent years, particularly in the United States. This is in part a result of a nostalgia for passenger trains (which are less common in the U.S. than in many other countries) and in part because it provides a very different experience from driving and from eating at ordinary restaurants.

The first dinner train in the United States was the "Supper Chief" that ran on the Sierra Railroad in California in the 1970s. Dinner train service was renewed in 1999 with the Sierra Railroad Dinner Train.

There are over 80 dinner trains currently operating in North America. Most such trains operate either seasonally or a few days a week, but some operate daily (or even twice daily on weekends in a few cases).

Almost all dinner trains run on lightly used branch lines or tourist lines, and virtually all use older passenger cars. Almost all dinner train trips are characterized by 2–4 hour trips that return to where they started since the emphasis is the experience and not traveling to a destination. Some feature the use of steam locomotives for at least some of their runs. Speeds are usually between 10–25 miles per hour (16–40 km/h), much slower than ordinary passenger trains, not only due to lower track standards but also to the fact that the emphasis is on the journey itself, not the destination.

In addition to just providing dinner while riding on a scenic route, some dinner trains have developed additional functions, such as hosting wedding receptions, reunions, company retreats, murder mystery events during the dinner.

Some so-called dinner trains do not actually serve meals aboard the train. Rather, the food is served in a building or outdoors after the train has reached its destination; the passengers then reboard for the return trip. This is particularly true for narrow gauge railways, on which it would be impractical to prepare and serve formal meals. Examples include the 2 ft (610 mm) gauge Puffing Billy Railway near Melbourne, Australia and the 3 ft (914 mm) gauge Lahaina Kaanapali Railroad in Maui, Hawaii.

== See also ==
- Colonial Tramcar Restaurant, one of several heritage trams that serves the same purpose as dinner trains
- Dinner Train, a former dinner train in the Netherlands
- Excursion train
- Joyful Train
- Orford Express, a tourist passenger train from Sherbrooke, Quebec to Magog
