= Tono Stano =

Slovak photographer (born 1960)

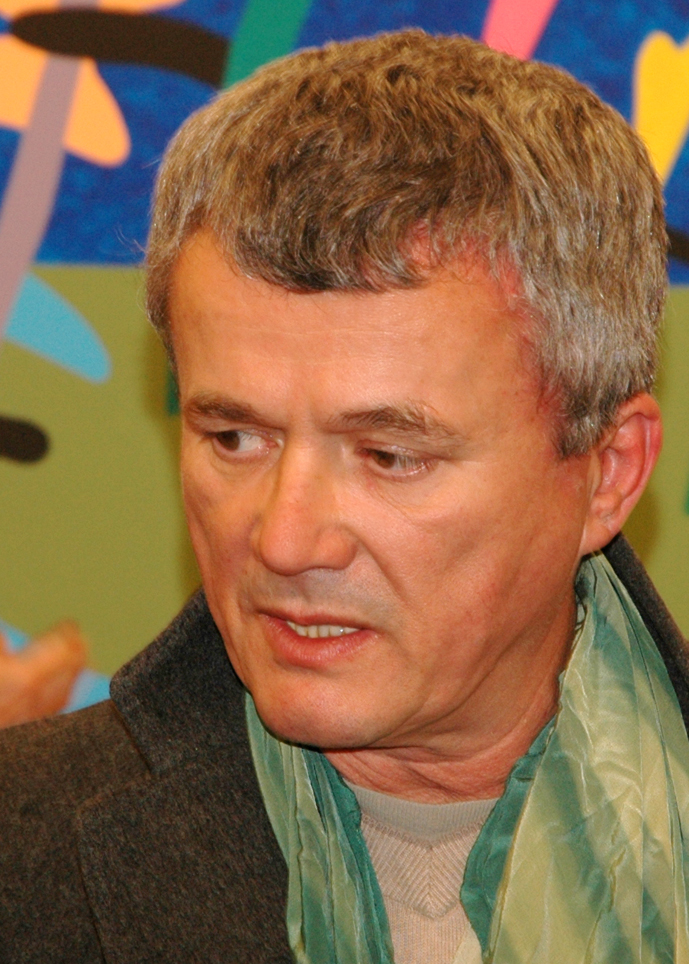
Tono Stano (2012)

Tono Stano (born 24 March 1960) is a Slovakia-born art photographer living and working in Prague, Czech Republic.

== Life and work ==
Stano was born in Zlaté Moravce, now Slovakia.

He attended the secondary school of applied arts in Bratislava from 1975 to 1979, and then, from 1980 to 1986, the FAMU in Prague (School of Film, Photography, and Television). Still during their studies, he and his fellow students (e.g. Miro Svolik) at FAMU developed a new style of staged photography, full of expressive movements and metaphor, partly influenced by performance art.

Stano is mainly known for his black-and-white photographs of the female body. Several of his photographs have been used for the cover of photography books. The picture "Sense", for example, appeared on the cover of the photography book The Body by William A. Ewing.

In 2001 he designed the statuette for the Karlovy Vary International Film Festival, for which he is a photographer.

== Solo exhibitions ==
- Fotochema, Prague, 1986
- Galerie G4, Cheb, 1989
- Le Pont Neuf, Paris, 1990
- Galerie U Recickych, Prague, 1992
- Palac Metro, Prague, 1992
- Narodni technicke Museum, Prague 1995
- Galerie Marzee, Nijmegen, The Netherlands, 1996
- Dom kultury, Bratislava, 1996
- Schoren, St. Gallen, Switzerland 2000
- Prazsky dum fotografie, Prague, 2001
- Slovak Institute and Czech Centre, Berlin, 2002
- Galerie Baudelaire, Antwerp, 2004
- Institut Français, Budapest, 2004

== Publications ==
- FotoTorst (2005). Tono Stano. Text by Magdalena Jurikova. ISBN 80-7215-247-5.
- Birgus, Vladimir (1999). Czech Photography of the 90s. Kant. ISBN 80-86217-00-0.
- Stano, Tono (1996). Praha. Posam.
