= Sri Lankan crown jewels =

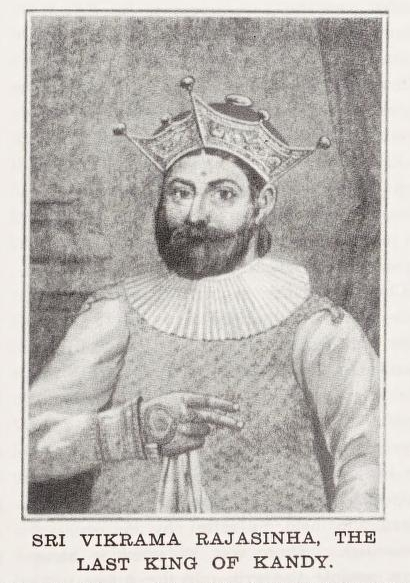
The Crown of Sri Vikrama Rajasinha

The Sri Lankan Crown Jewels include the Regalia of the Kingdom of Kandy which consists of the crown, throne, scepter and sword of state. These have been used by the Monarchy of Ceylon from 1948 to 1972.

== Crown of King Rajasinghe II ==
The Crown of King Rajasinghe II was held by the Dodanwela Devale since it was present by the king in 1638 until it was transferred to the National Museum of Kandy and stolen in 1961.

== Crown of Sri Vikrama Rajasinha and the Kandyan Throne ==
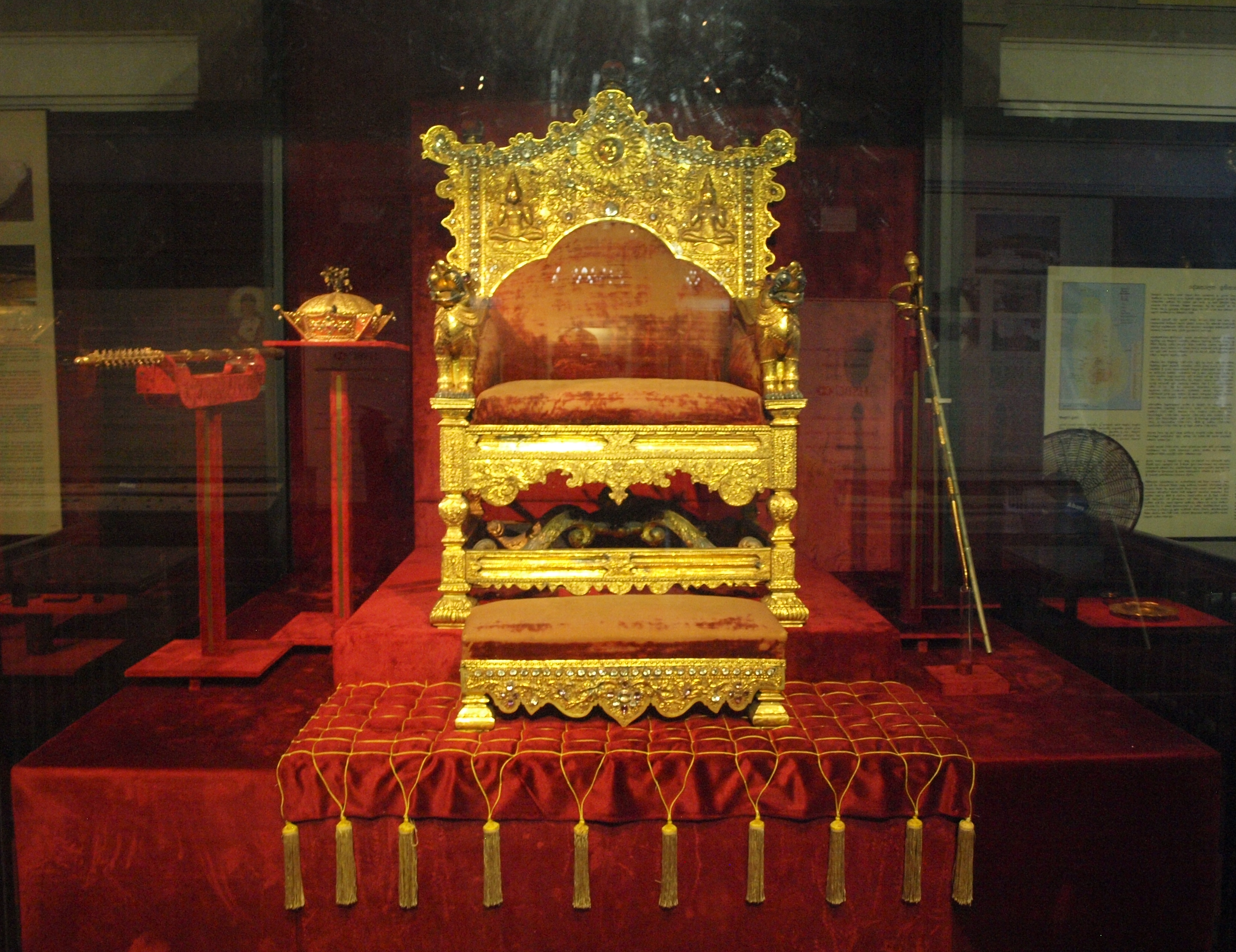
The Crown, Throne, Sword of State, Scepter of the Last King of the Kandyan Kingdom.

The throne of the Kandyan Kingdom was gifted to Vimaladharmasuriya II by the Dutch in 1692. With the fall of the kingdom, the last king of Kandy, Sri Vikrama Rajasinha was arrested by the British. Personal possessions of the King which included his crown, sword, sword belt, scepter and other jewellery were looted by their captors including earrings that were torn out from the ears of the Queens. These along with the throne looted from the Royal Palace Complex of Kandy were taken by the British and auctioned, apart from the crown, throne, scepter, sword belt and sword of state which were presented to the Prince regent and kept at Carlton House. When Carlton House was demolished, the items were moved to Windsor Castle. The throne was placed in the Garter Throne Room and used for investitures of the Knights of the Garter, including Victor Emmanuel II of Italy (1861), King Haakon VII of Norway (1906), and Manuel II of Portugal (1908).. Its presence was raised by the Ceylon Daily News in 1924 and on 30 November 1933, a resolution was moved by George E. de Silva in the State Council requesting the repatriation of the Crown and Throne, which was passed in February 1934. King George V agreed to present the Crown and Throne to Ceylon and in September 1934, Prince Henry, Duke of Gloucester on a royal visit to the island presented the Crown, Throne and its step stool at an reception at the King's Pavilion in Kandy and it was placed on permanent display at the Colombo Museum. The sceptre, sword and belt were returned in 1936 by King Edward VIII. In the 1980s, the throne, then in the Colombo Museum, was vandalized by thieves during a robbery. The damaged areas of the throne were restored by acting Archaeological Commissioner Dr. Roland Silva.

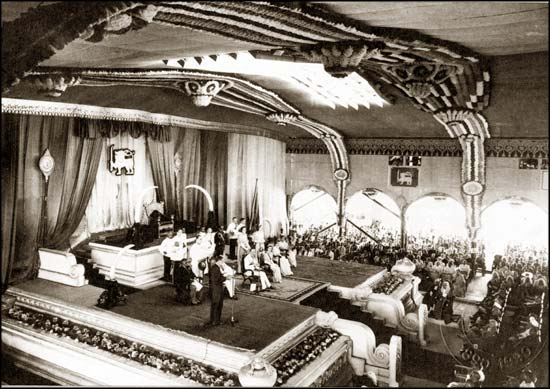
The Crown and the throne at the opening the first session of the Ceylonese Parliament on 10 February 1948

The Royal regalia was adopted by the Monarchy of Ceylon, with the enactment of the Ceylon Independence Act 1947 which established the Dominion of Ceylon. On the ceremonial opening of the first parliament of Ceylon on 10 February 1948, the royal regalia was used in the ceremony representing the monarch of the Ceylon. On her royal tour of Ceylon in April 1954, Queen Elizabeth II gave the Throne Speech from the Kandyan Throne.

== Royal weaponry ==
=== Rijksmuseum collection ===
In 2023, the Rijksmuseum returned weapons looted from the Royal Palace of Kandy during the Kandyan–Dutch war. The items included the Lewke's cannon, a Golden Kastane, a Silver Kastane, a Sinhalese Knife and two Maha Guns.

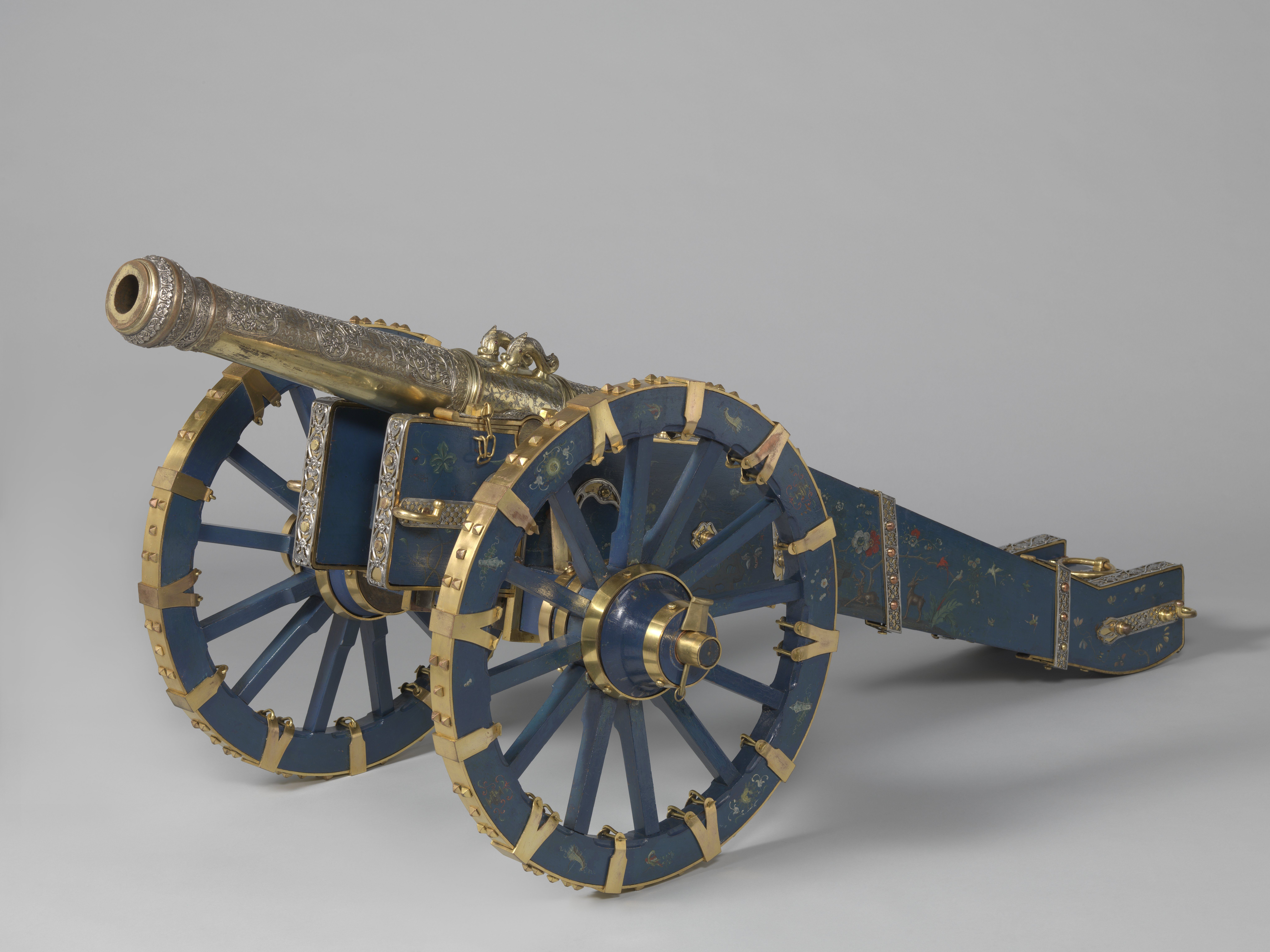
Lewke's cannon

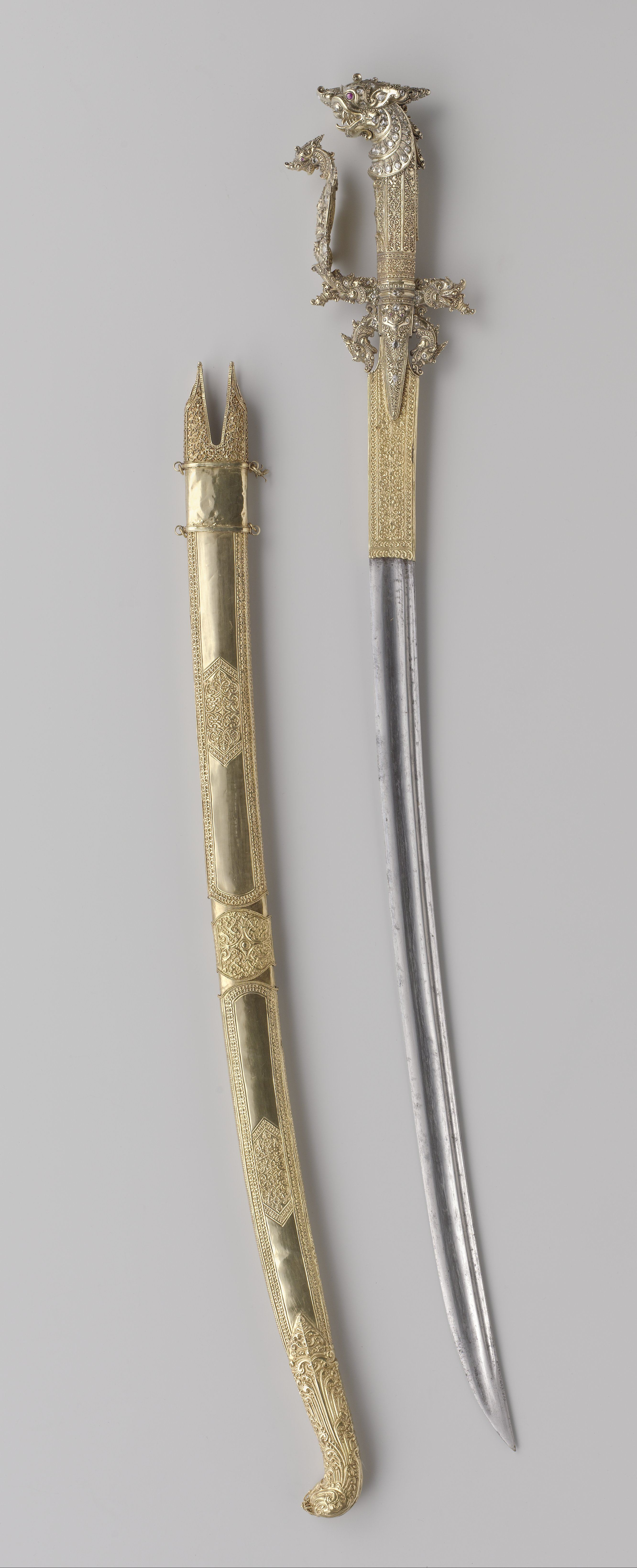
Golden Kastane

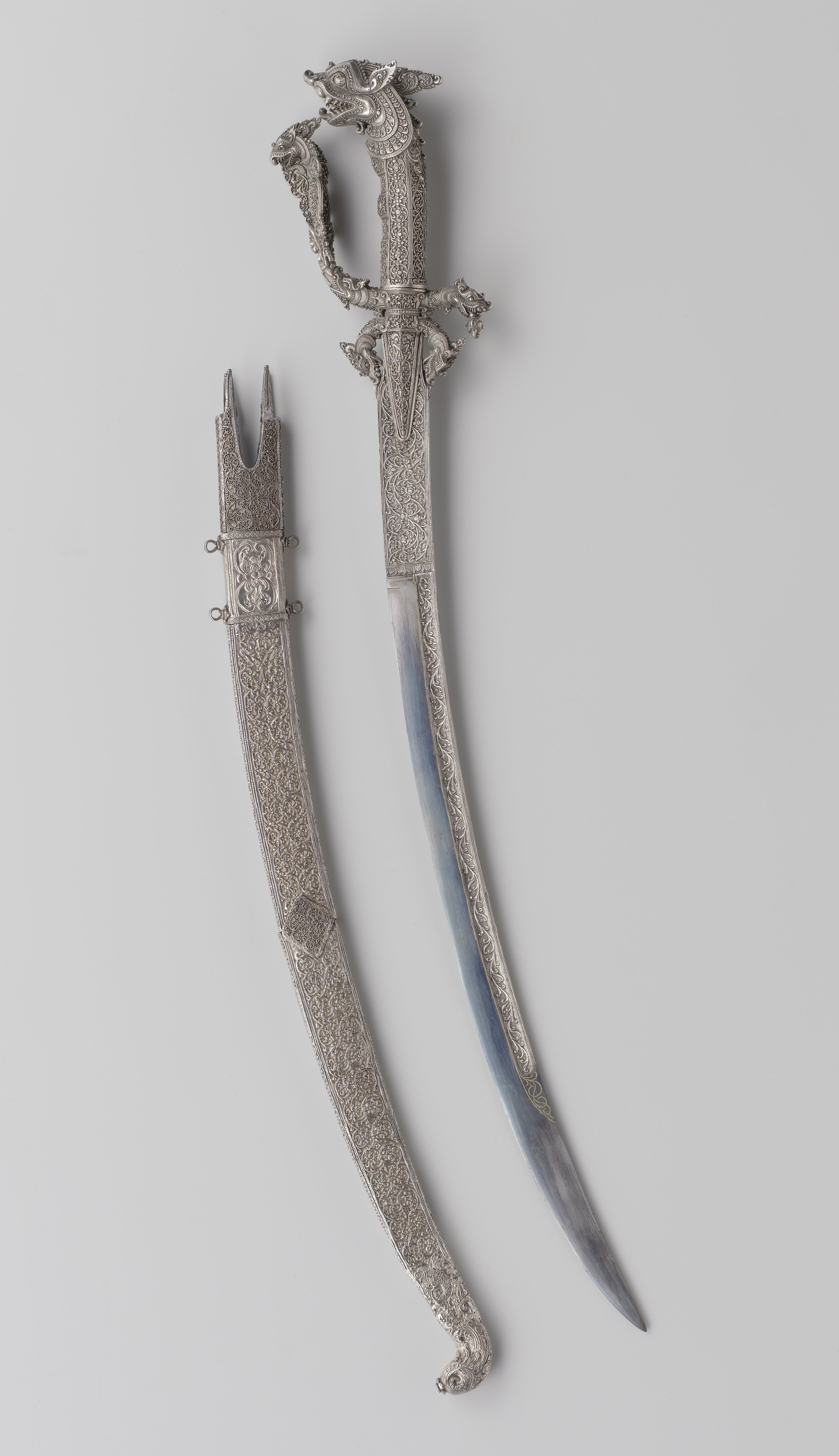
Silver Kastane

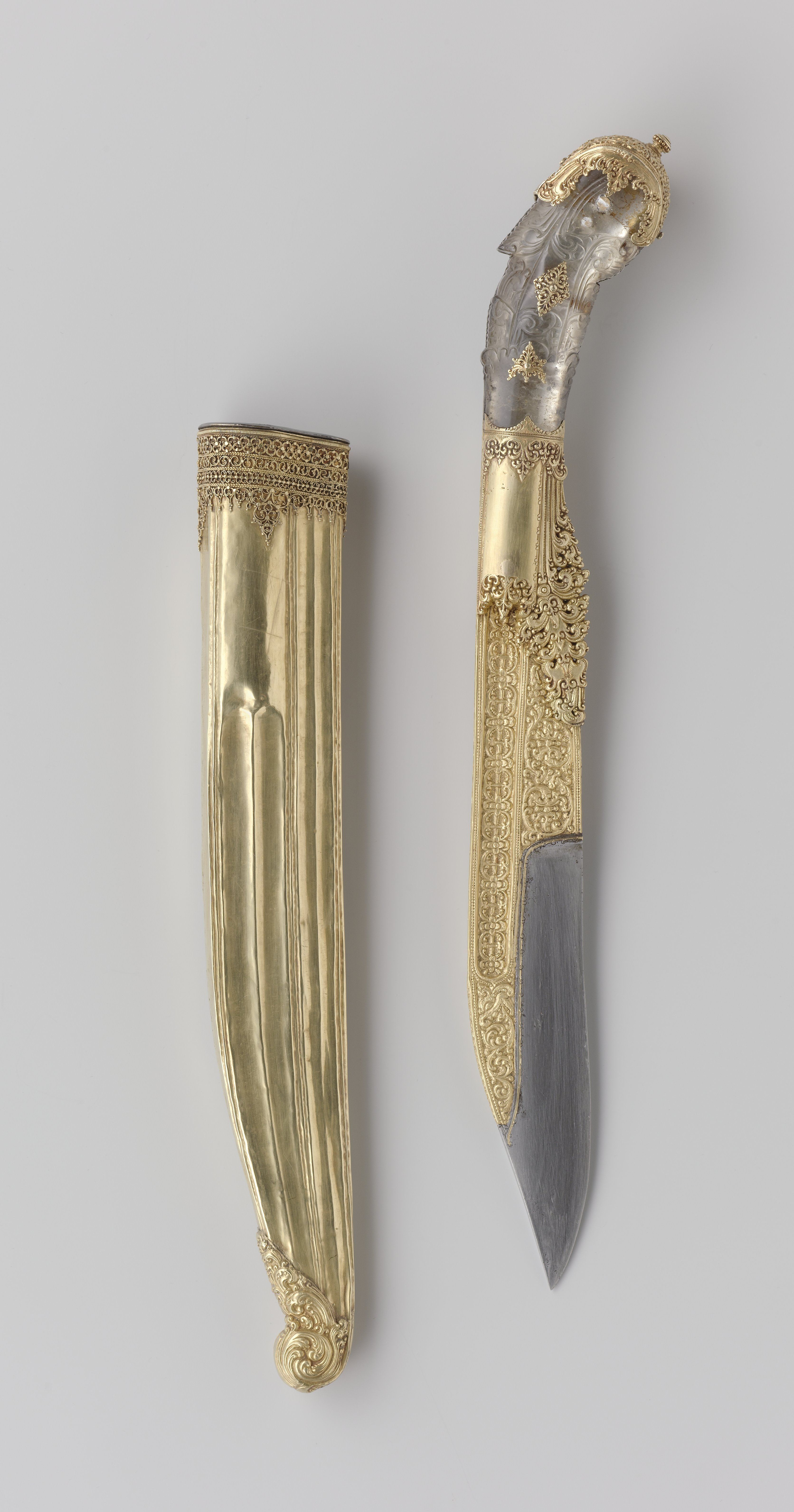
Sinhalese Knife

=== Repatriation of Kastane ===
In 2017, Russian president Vladimir Putin returned a royal Kastane to then President Maithripala Sirisena.
