= 2027 in the Netherlands =

- Decades: 2000s; 2010s; 2020s
- See also: Other events of 2027; History of the Netherlands

Events from the year 2027 in the Netherlands.

== Events ==
=== Predicted and scheduled ===
- August 13–22 – 2027 Beach Volleyball World Championships
- October 15–24 – 2027 IKF World Korfball Championship

== Holidays ==
- 1 January – New Year's Day
- 3 April – Good Friday
- 5 April – Easter Sunday
- 6 April – Easter Monday
- 27 April – King's Day
- 5 May – Liberation Day
- 14 May – Ascension Day
- 24–25 June – Pentecost
- 25 December – Christmas Day
- 26 December – Boxing Day

== See also ==
- 2027 in the European Union
- 2027 in Europe
