= Dinner Train (Netherlands) =

Train restaurant in the Netherlands

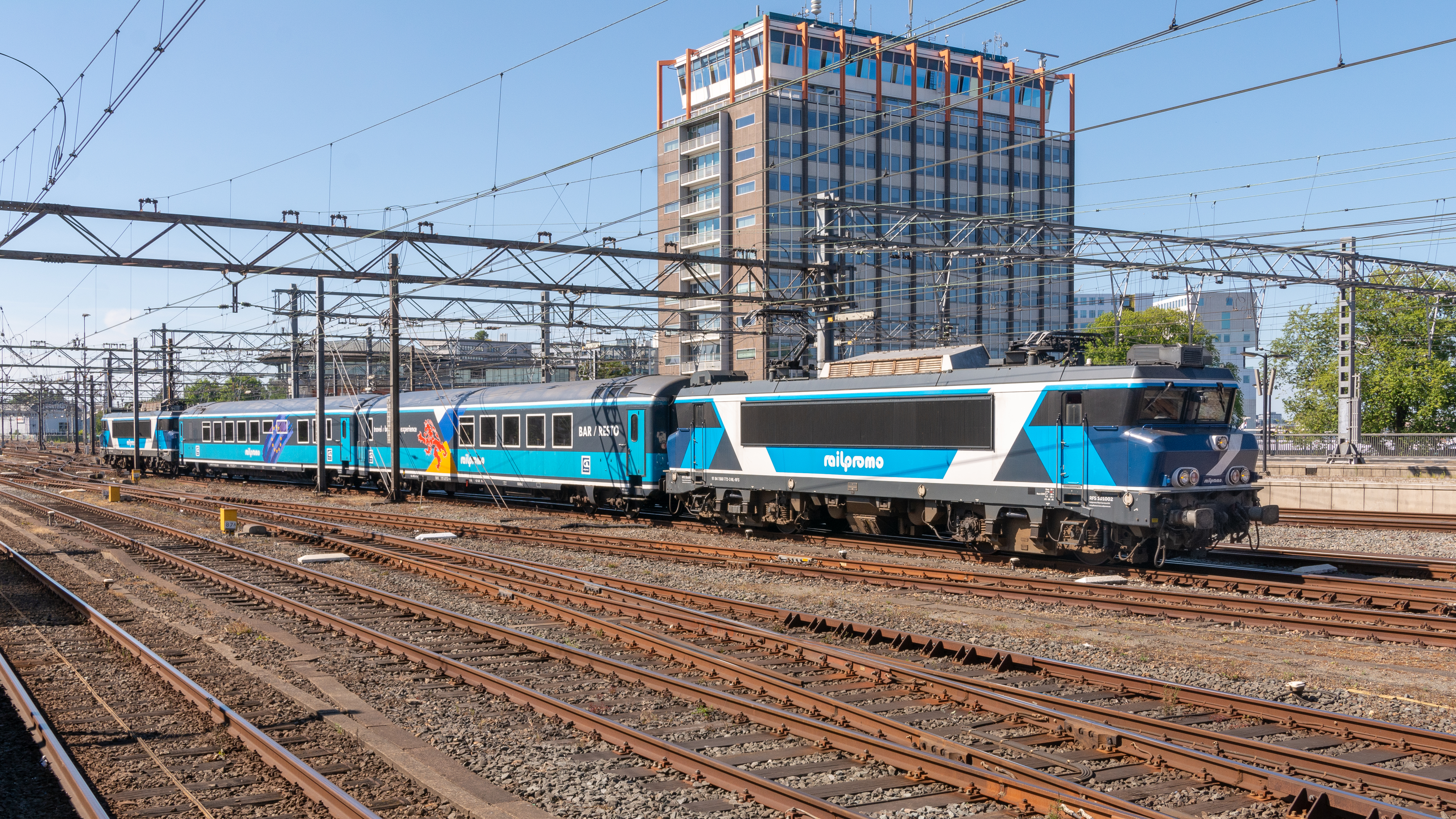
Dinner Train at Amsterdam Central Station

Dinner Train, formerly known as The Panorama Rail Restaurant, was a mobile train restaurant that ran through the Netherlands from 2015. Starting in 2019, after takeover, it left in a different city every week. The operation was in the hands of Train Charter Events, based in Oisterwijk. The company declared bankruptcy on 28 August 2024.
