= André Hissink =

Dutch World War II pilot (1919–2024)

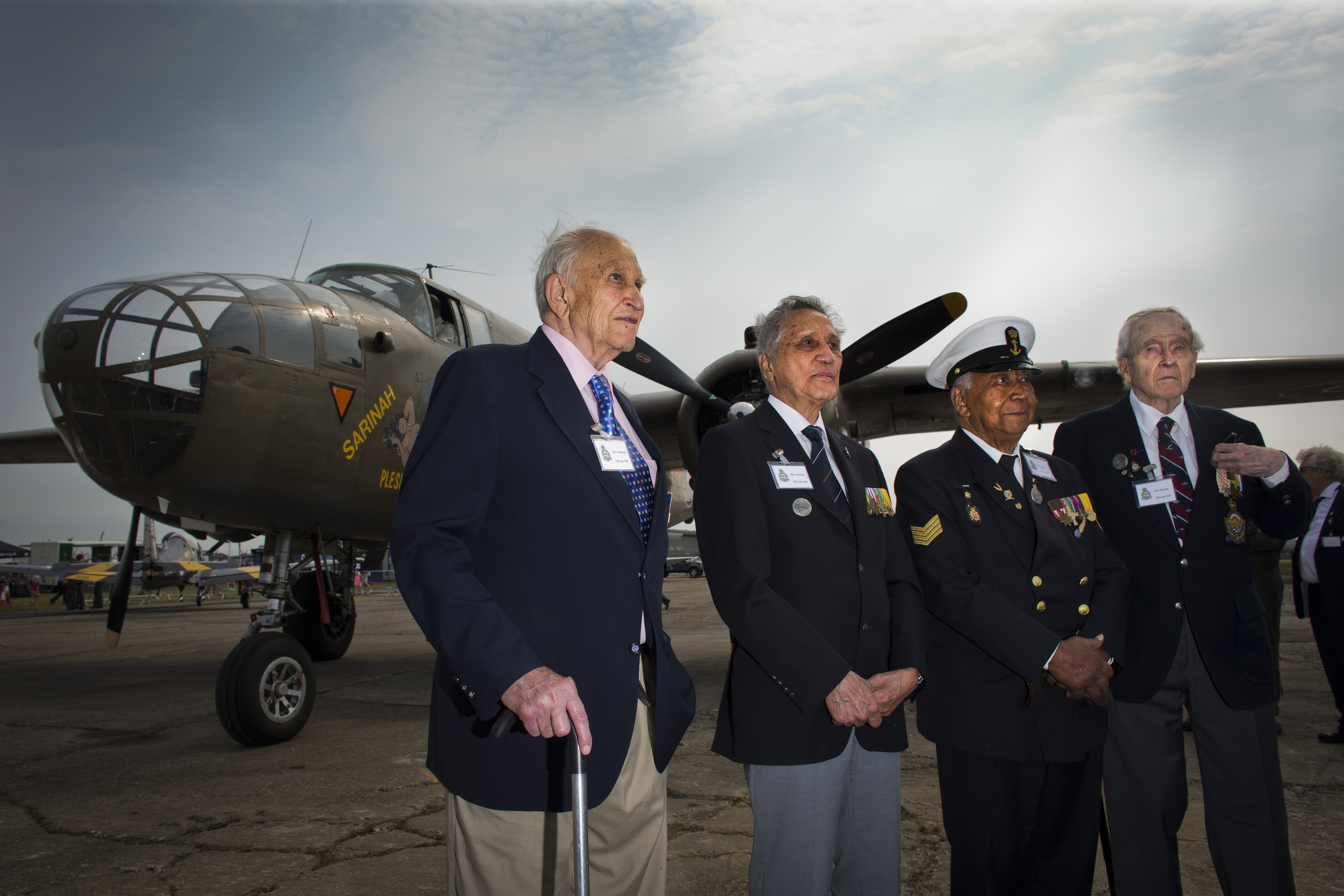
- Hissink in 2016 (far right)
- Born: 26 June 1919
- Died: 1 January 2024 (aged 104)
- Occupation: World War II pilot

André Louis Armand Hissink (26 June 1919 – 1 January 2024) was a Dutch soldier who served with the 320 Dutch Squadron of the British Royal Air Force (RAF) during World War II.

== Biography ==
André Louis Armand Hissink was born on 26 June 1919 in Batavia, Dutch East Indies, moving with his family to the Netherlands at the age of eight. After high school, he studied law at Utrecht University, but dropped out after being drafted into the army because of the mobilisation. He escaped the bombing of Rotterdam and left for the United Kingdom. In 1943, he completed his training as a pilot in his hometown of Batavia, as well as in the United States, after which he joined the RAF as a bomber pilot. He became part of the 320 Dutch Squadron, which carried out war missions over the Netherlands, Belgium, France and Germany. Hissink was shot out of the sky in December 1944 after an attack on the Germans during the Battle of the Bulge, but he managed to survive. In total, he flew 69 sorties with this squadron.

Hissink was awarded the Flying Cross on 21 December 1944.

After the war, Hissink returned to the Netherlands, where he applied for jobs as a pilot, but was told that there was no place for him in Dutch aviation. He had more success abroad, working in Switzerland, New Zealand and Canada.

In May 2022, the 102-year-old Hissink regained his Dutch nationality, which he relinquished in 1953 in order to be able to work abroad. He had lived in Ontario, Canada, since 1993.

Hissink died on 1 January 2024 at the age of 104.
