= Death of Alfredo Goeloe =

2026 death of a Rotterdam man shortly after a police arrest

Fifty-one year-old Rotterdam resident Juan Alfredo Goeloe died shortly after his mistaken arrest by the police in Rotterdam, the Netherlands, on 12 September 2026. Goeloe became unwell during or immediately after the arrest and died despite resuscitation attempts.

The circumstances of Goeloe's death were investigated by the Dutch Rijksrecherche. The incident prompted public protests and renewed debate about police brutality, mistaken identity, and accountability for deaths occurring during arrests.

== Arrest and death ==
On the evening of 12 September 2026, police officers in Rotterdam-Zuid were conducting checks after a report of a stolen fatbike. They stopped Goeloe while he was riding a fatbike. Police later confirmed that his bicycle was not the stolen bicycle for which officers were searching.

According to the Public Prosecution Service, Goeloe was unable to produce identification. An officer then attempted to search him in order to establish his identity, after which Goeloe ran away. He was subsequently arrested and resisted the arrest, according to the prosecution service. He then became unwell and officers attempted to resuscitate him. He died shortly afterwards.

Video footage circulated on social media appeared to show several officers holding Goeloe on the ground while he called for help. The precise sequence of events, including the force used and the medical circumstances of his death, remained under investigation.

Goeloe's family said that he had been returning from a baby shower for his unborn child and had been on his way to collect diabetes medication. His partner, Charnelle Babel, was seven months pregnant at the time of the incident.

The police confirmed that Goeloe had not been riding the stolen fatbike that officers were seeking. The reason why he fled after being stopped, and whether any other circumstances contributed to the arrest, remained subject to investigation. Media reports differed on additional allegations concerning possible possession of drugs, which had not been established by the official investigation at the time of reporting.

== Investigation ==
The Rijksrecherche, an independent investigative body that examines possible criminal conduct by public officials, opened an investigation into the circumstances surrounding Goeloe's death. The Public Prosecution Service declined to comment in detail while the investigation was ongoing.

Goeloe's family announced through their lawyer, Gerald Roethof, that his eldest daughter intended to file a complaint against the officers involved. Roethof said that possible legal characterizations could include manslaughter, assault resulting in death or death caused by reckless conduct, although he emphasized that the facts still had to be established.

== Protests ==
On 14 September 2026, a silent march was held in Rotterdam-Zuid in memory of Goeloe and in protest against police violence. The march passed the location where he had been arrested and ended near a police station.

After the march, some participants threw objects at the police station and at riot police. Police deployed the Mobile Unit and made at least one arrest, according to Dutch media reports.

The protests were reported internationally as part of wider concerns about police violence and accountability in the Netherlands.

== Reactions ==
Jair Schalkwijk of the Dutch police-accountability organization Controle Alt Delete said after the march that Goeloe had not been the thief whom police were seeking. The organization called for a full investigation into the arrest and the conduct of the officers involved.

Goeloe's family criticized the police response and sought legal representation to examine whether the use of force contributed to his death. Police and prosecutors stated that the investigation had to establish what happened during the arrest before responsibility could be determined.

Hundreds of people attended silent vigils in his name in Rotterdam and in Utrecht.

== See also ==
- Police brutality
- Police brutality in the Netherlands
- Deaths in police custody
