= Herman Wouters =

Belgian politician (1940–2026)

Herman Wouters (19 February 1940 – 11 January 2026) was a Belgian politician.

== Life and career ==
Wouters was born in Grobbendonk on 19 February 1940. He became politically active in the run-up to the 1976 municipal elections at the request of the then mayors John Smets of Grobbendonk and Willy Taelman of Bouwel. He was elected as a municipal councillor on the electoral list Gemeentebelangen Grobbendonk-Bouwel (GGB). Professionally he worked in a notary's office, he was also active in the local theater company and football team. In 1980 he was appointed alderman for finance and culture, a mandate he would hold for three years.

In 1988, Wouters was mandated as mayor. After the municipal elections of 1994, his reappointment was blocked. He was accused of conflict of interest in late 1995 and referred to the criminal court. As a former notary employee, he would not have left the council session when discussing allotment conditions. At the end of 1996 he obtained a stay of judgment. Minister of the Interior Johan Vande Lanotte refused to appoint him as mayor in early 1997. After this verdict was confirmed by the Council of State there was an alternating majority in the municipal council of Grobbendonk between CVP, Agalev and SP with the socialist Karel Bogaerts as mayor.

In the municipal elections of 2000, Wouters was again the party leader, this time not under the name of GGB, but under the party name VLD. He became mayor again in a coalition between VLD and CVP. Six years later, this coalition was continued and he remained mayor until 2012.

Wouters died on 11 January 2026, at the age of 85.
