= Hélène Egger =

Dutch Holocaust survivor (1929–2024)

- Born: 21 November 1929; Amsterdam, Netherlands
- Died: 4 February 2024 (aged 94); Baarn, Netherlands
- Occupation: Holocaust survivor

Hélène Petter-Egger (21 November 1929 – 4 February 2024) was a Dutch Holocaust survivor.

== Biography ==
Egger was born in Baarn, Netherlands in 1929. As a young girl she had lost her mother who died from a brain tumour. The Second World War broke out when she was 10 years old. Due to the German invasion of the Netherlands, she left her family to live in Amsterdam with her grandparents. As Leentje Bakker, she lived in Vorstenbosch from mid-1944 to May 1945. By the end of the war she was the only surviving member of her immediate family. She learned that her two brothers had been deported to Auschwitz concentration camp. She was later adopted by her extended family including her grandparents, uncle and aunt. She married a non-Jewish man in 1953 and did not speak about her past with him or their children until later in life.

She first became a contemporary witness in 1997 in a video interview she gave for the Shoah Foundation. Her daughter, the newsreader Debby_Petter, wrote a book on her mothers life. The book was later adapted into a play. In 2018, a short film based on her life “Ik ben er nog” (made for the permanent exhibition "The Netherlands in the Second World War" in the Dutch Overloon War Museum) premiered in Las Vegas during The New York Festivals and won a Gold World Medal. The film had previously also won a Dutch film award in 2017. In 2024, Hélène Petter-Egger died in her hometown of Baarn at the age of 94.
