= Wim Kozijn =

Dutch politician (1940–2024)

Mayor of 's-Graveland
- In office 1987–2002

Personal details
- Born: Willem Jacob Kozijn; 28 August 1940 Herwijnen, German-occupied Netherlands
- Died: 26 April 2024 (aged 83)
- Political party: Labour Party (Netherlands)

Willem Jacob "Wim" Kozijn (28 August 1940 – 26 April 2024) was a Dutch politician from the Labour Party.

== Life and career ==
After his compulsory military service, which he largely served in Dutch New Guinea, he became a teacher at a secondary school/mavo in Driebergen in 1964 . He later taught at other courses and was also a municipal councillor and alderman in the municipality of Driebergen-Rijsenburg.

In March 1987, Kozijn became mayor of the North Holland municipality of 's-Graveland. On 1 January 2002, that municipality was merged into the new municipality of Wijdemeren, which meant that his position was abolished. From that date he was acting mayor of the municipality of Castricum, which had also just been reorganized. In mid-June, Aaltje Emmens-Knol was appointed mayor there and a month later he became acting mayor again, now in Brummen to replace the long-term ill mayor Lynde Blok. In the last months of 2005 he was acting mayor of Driebergen-Rijsenburg where he started his new political career. On 1 January 2006, that municipality was merged into the new municipality of Utrechtse Heuvelrug. He was then acting mayor of the municipality of Weesp from 6 June 2006, to 1 January 2007, and he was acting mayor of Medemblik until September 2007, after which he finally became an observer in Blaricum.

Kozijn died on 26 April 2024, at the age of 83.
