= 2024 The Hague explosion =

Fatal apartment explosion in the Netherlands

- Date: December 7, 2024
- Time: 06:15 (CET)
- Location: Mariahoeve en Marlot neighborhood of The Hague, Netherlands; 52.0886°N 4.3537°E
- Type: Explosion
- Cause: Under investigation
- Deaths: 6
- Injuries: 4
- Property damage: Five apartment flats destroyed
- Accused: Moshtag Barekzai, Ilyas and Mourad from Roosendaal and Adil from Oosterhout

In the early morning of December 7, 2024, a major explosion occurred in the Mariahoeve en Marlot neighborhood of The Hague, Netherlands, resulting in at least six fatalities, injuries, and significant damage to several residential buildings. The explosion prompted a large scale emergency response and investigation.

According to the police, the explosions were aimed at a bridal clothing store on the ground floor of the affected apartment complex.

== Disaster ==
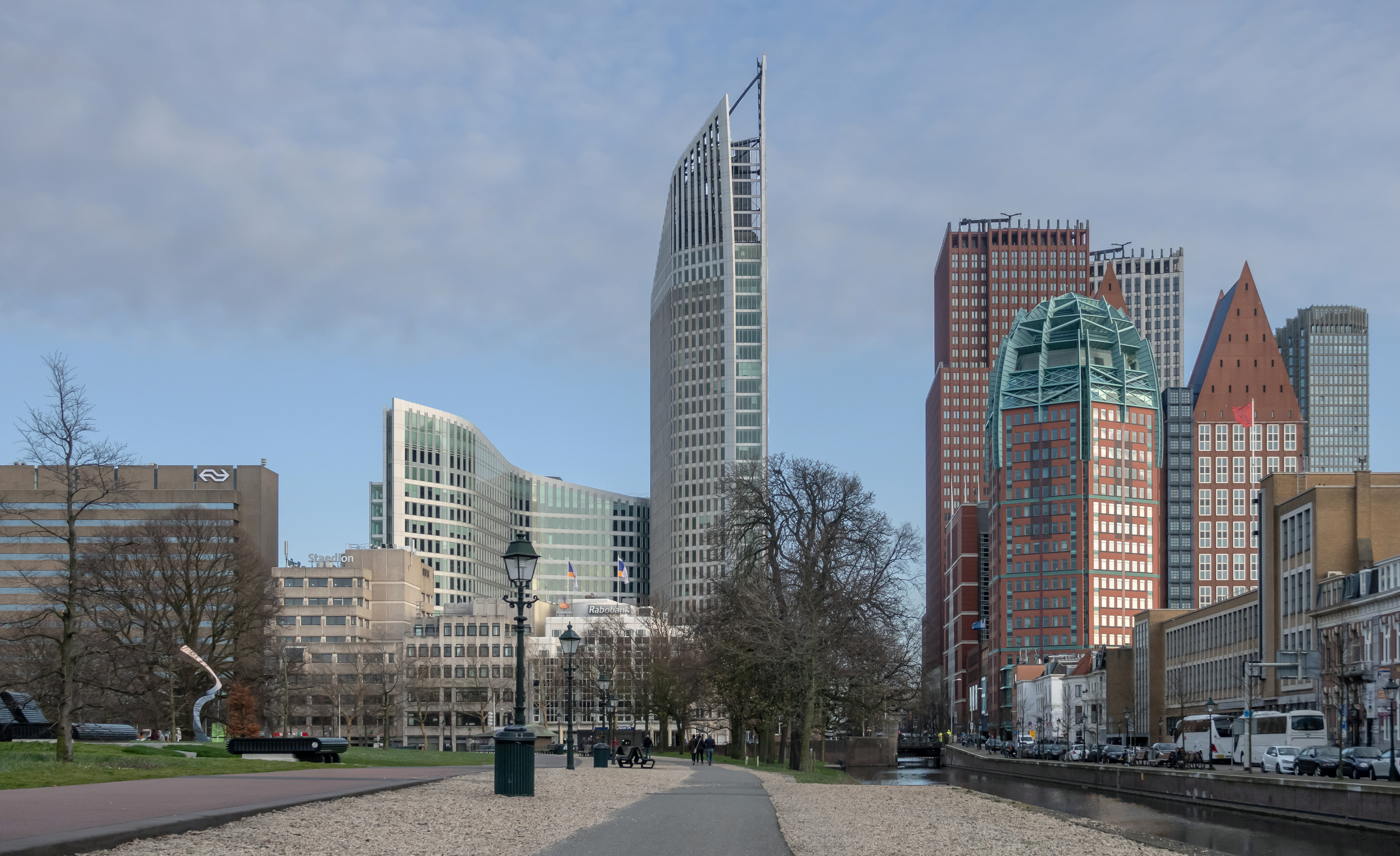

The explosion and resulting fire occurred before dawn in the northeastern neighbourhood of Mariahoeve en Marlot, within district Haagse Hout at approximately 06:15 local time (05:15 GMT). Local residents reported hearing a massive explosion and screams, with some initially mistaking the event for an earthquake. The blast destroyed five apartment units and led to the evacuation of 40 adjacent apartments.

Two victims were sleeping in the basement of a bar and required hospitalization for smoke inhalation.

The rescue operations ended on December 9, with the toll of six people killed and five injured as a result of the explosion. As many as 20 people were initially believed to have been in the apartment flats destroyed by the explosion. Three of the dead belonged to the same family, leaving an eight-year old boy as the only survivor.

A bridal store and art studio were also completely destroyed by the explosion.

=== Response ===
Emergency services deployed a specialized urban search and rescue team who had participated in rescue efforts following the 2023 Turkey–Syria earthquakes, including four trained sniffer dogs and an excavator to remove debris, to the disaster site. Local authorities evacuated neighboring buildings as a precautionary measure. Emergency services rescued four individuals from the debris, who were subsequently hospitalized. One victim was initially reported to have been a child, although this was later disproven. Search operations continued for possible additional victims.

== Reactions ==
Prime Minister Dick Schoof issued a statement expressing shock at the disaster and extending sympathies to victims and emergency responders.

Mayor of The Hague Jan van Zanen stated that the likelihood of finding additional survivors was minimal following initial rescue efforts, telling the community to be ready for the "worst case scenario".

Police Commissioner Janny Knol acknowledged the incident's impact on community sentiment, citing "disbelief and uncertainty."

King Willem-Alexander and Queen Máxima issued a statement expressing sympathy for those affected by the disaster and those concerned about missing loved ones. They visited the disaster site in the morning of 9 December.

== Investigation ==
The cause of the explosion remains under investigation, with Mayor of The Hague Jan van Zanen stating that authorities were examining all possibilities. Law enforcement expressed interest in a vehicle reportedly leaving the scene "at a very high speed", considering it potentially relevant to their investigation. It was also reported that gas cans were found in the debris.

On December 10, 2024, authorities said that they had arrested three suspects in connection to the explosions. Several vehicles were confiscated, but it is currently unknown if any of them are the same vehicle that was seen speeding away from the crime scene. The suspects were said to be in "restrictive custody" and were only allowed contact with their attorneys. A fourth suspect was apprehended on 11 December. According to RTL Nieuws, the attack targeted a bridal clothing store owned by the ex-girlfriend of one of the perpetrators.
