= Paul de Nooijer =

Dutch photographer and filmmaker (1943–2025)

Paul de Nooijer (15 June 1943 – 12 December 2025) was a Dutch photographer and filmmaker.

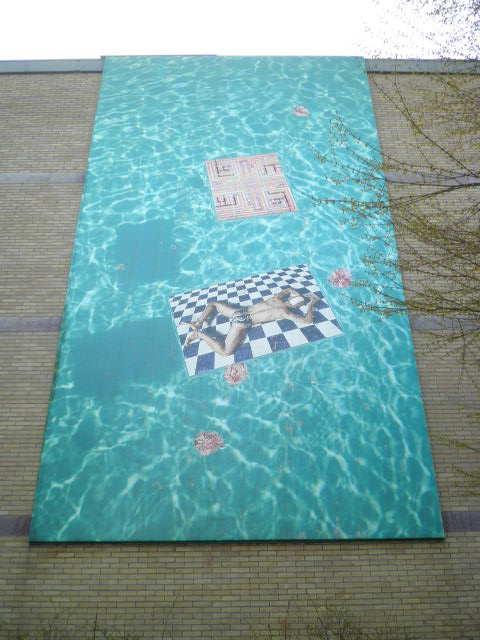
Broken Fronts by Paul de Nooijer

== Life and career ==
Nooijer was born in Eindhoven on 15 June 1943. He was inspired to become a visual artist at the age of ten, when he saw an exhibition of magical realists at the Van Abbemuseum. From 1960 to 1965, de Nooijer studied industrial design at the Academy of Industrial Design in Eindhoven.

Initially, he earned a living as an advertising photographer, he learned the trade from De Gruyter and was given the opportunity to develop his personal style with a number of clients. In 1974, he won the Grand Prix internationale de la recherche photographique for his photomontages, and this foreign interest led to him becoming known throughout the Netherlands. An exhibition in the Canon Photo Gallery in Amsterdam followed.

From the 1980s onwards, his interest shifted to video clips. He also made short films, often with stop-motion technique, and the feature film Exit (1997).

== Illness and death ==
Later in life, he was diagnosed with prostate cancer. He created a short film Is Heaven Blue? #2, a work imbued with melancholy.

Nooijer died on 12 December 2025, at the age of 82.
