= Helmet of Coțofenești =

5th century BCE Geto-Dacian helmet

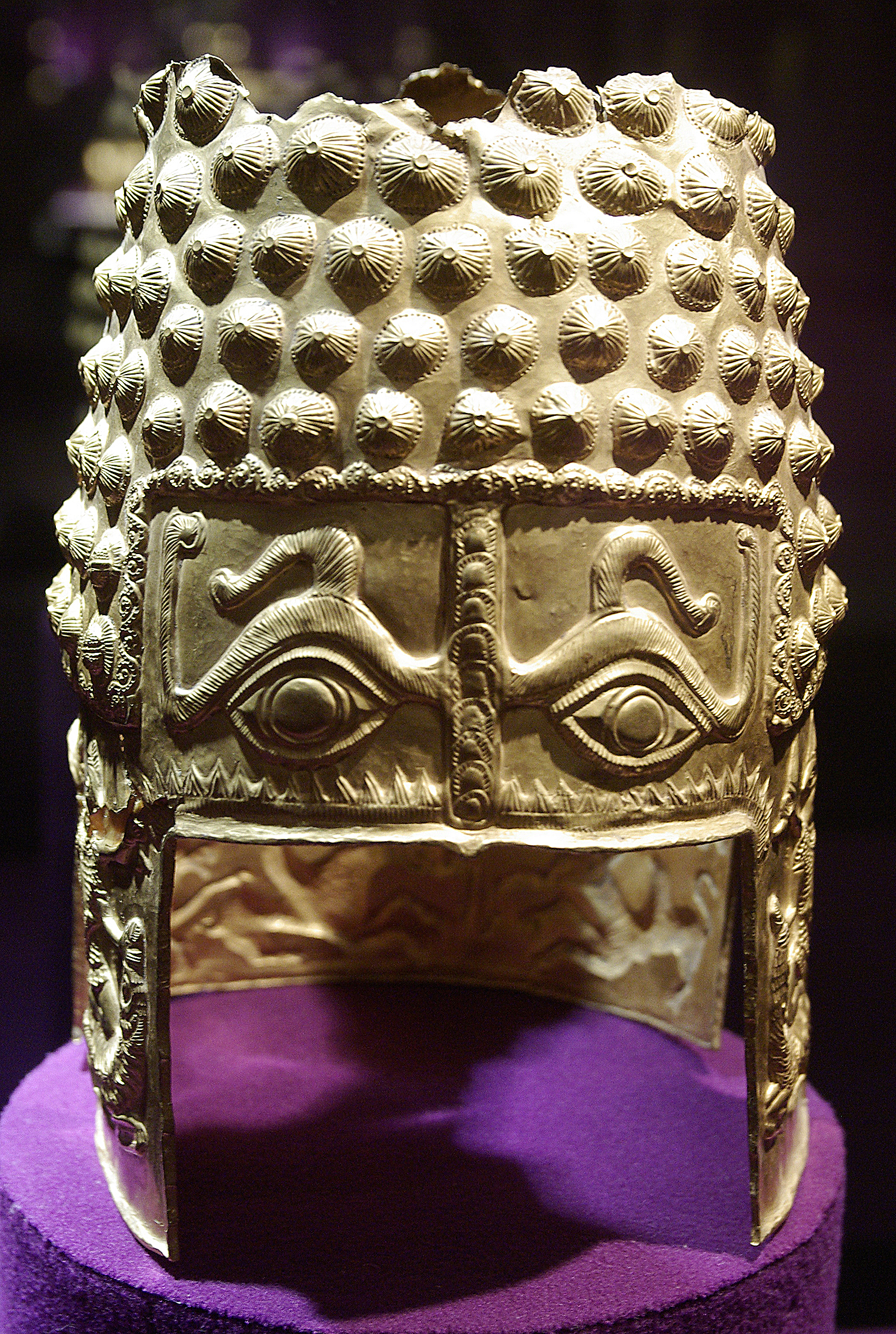
- Material: Electrum (gold-silver-copper alloy)
- Created: between 450–400 BC
- Discovered: Late 1920s Coțofenești, Vărbilău, Prahova County, Romania
- Present location: National History Museum of Romania

The Golden Helmet of Coțofenești (Romanian pronunciation: [kot͡sofeˈneʃtʲ]) is a Geto-Dacian helmet made of electrum dating from the second half of the 5th century BC. Discovered in the Romanian village of Coțofenești, it was exhibited at the National History Museum of Romania in Bucharest before being stolen in 2025 during a robbery at the Drents Museum in Assen, the Netherlands, where it was being displayed as part of a travelling exhibition. The helmet was recovered on April 2, 2026 with light damage.

== Provenance ==
=== Discovery ===
The helmet was discovered in 1926 on a grassland by a farmer's child named Traian Simion who was herding sheep in the village of Poiana Coțofenești (now part of Vărbilău commune), Prahova County, Romania, at a location called Vârful Fundăturii. The child reportedly wore the helmet for two weeks and used it as a toy, causing some parts to become detached from the helmet. According to archeologist's analysis, the top part of the helmet was damaged by being hit or pulled on while hanging on a tree. The helmet was also used as a watering trough for chickens, and eventually the farmer placed it on top of his chicken coop.

At some time, a Ploiești merchant by the name of Ion (or Jean) Marinescu-Moreanu bought the helmet, including the detached upper part, for the sum of 30,000 lei, equivalent to up to 30 years' income for the farmer. Marinescu offered the helmet to head of the Ministry of Arts Ion Marin Sadoveanu. In April 1929, the helmet was purchased by the Ministry of Public Instruction and Cults for the National Museum of Antiquities, now the National History Museum of Romania. Initially, Marinescu was celebrated for saving a national treasure, but after the landslide 1928 Romanian general election, Marinescu, presumably a sympathizer of the losing Liberal Party, was vilified for "enriching himself".

Since the 1970s, the helmet has been kept at the National History Museum of Romania.

=== Site survey ===
Archaeologist Ioan Andrieșescu, professor of prehistory at the University of Bucharest, conducted a thorough investigation at the site. The team of archaeologists noticed that the helmet was not part of a gold treasure or grave but it was part of a local Geto-Dacian La Tène settlement. Archaeologists concluded that the helmet was a stray find, as only a few late Hallstatt pottery fragments were found, some of them wheeled.

== Analysis ==
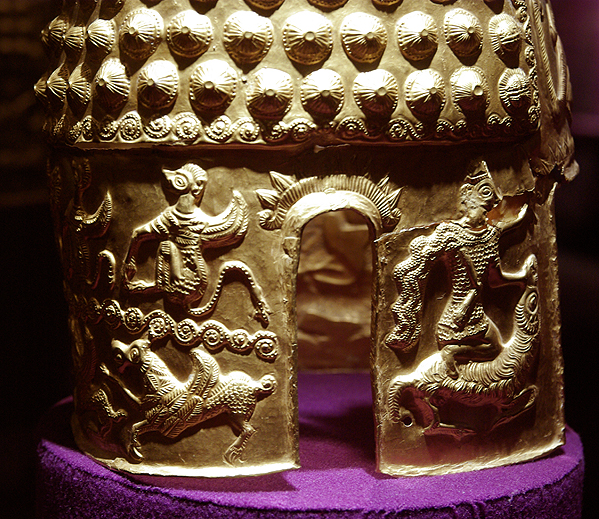
Mythological scene on the side

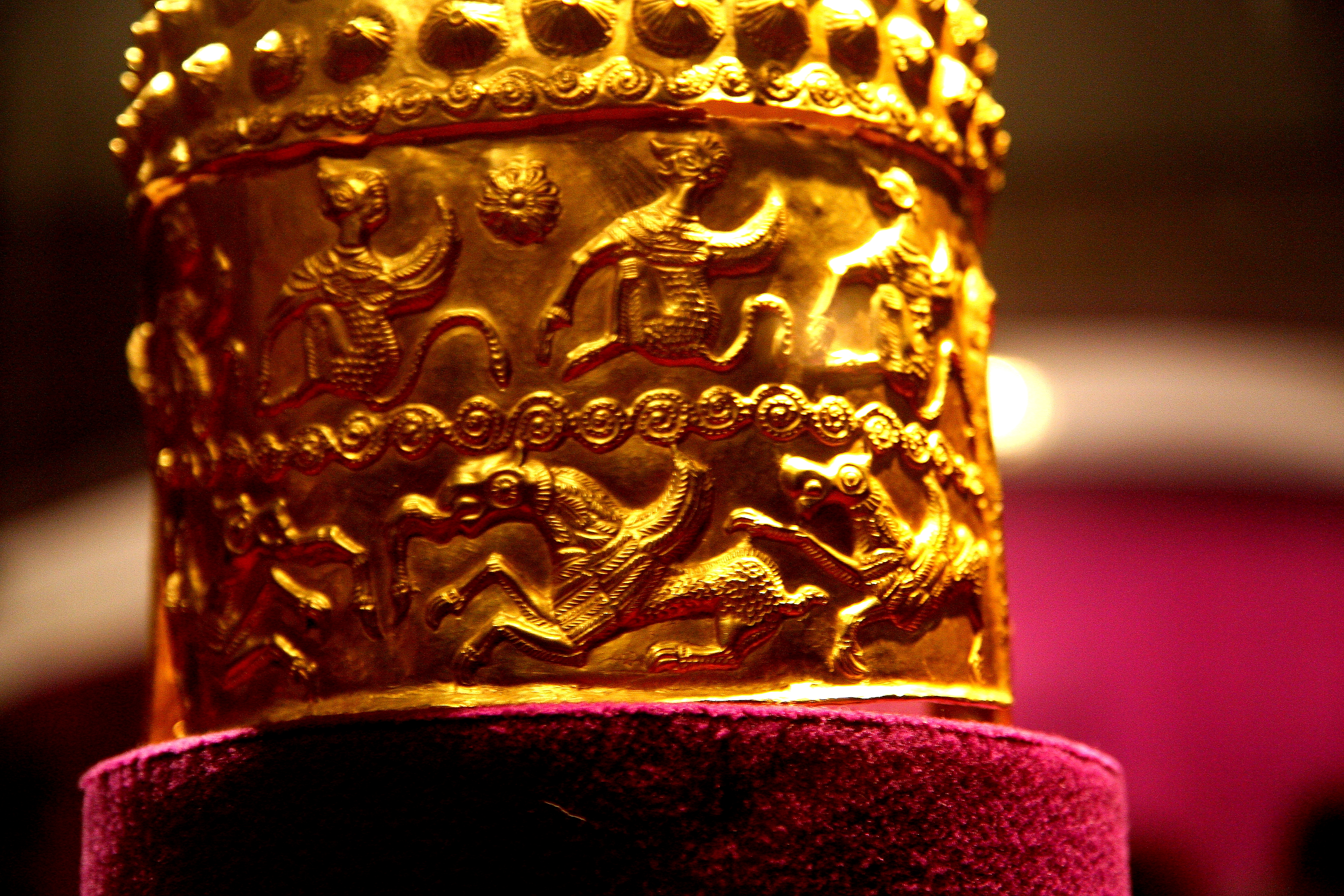
Mythological scene on the back

Weighing almost a kilogram, the gold helmet is very well preserved, missing only part of its skull cap. The form of the helmet and its decorations reveal the autochthonous character of this Geto-Dacian artwork. The helmet is decorated with large studs on the top of the skull and two very large apotropaic eyes, meant to ward off the evil eye and magic spells. It was established that it belonged to an unknown local Geto-Dacian king or to a local aristocrat, from around year 400 BC.

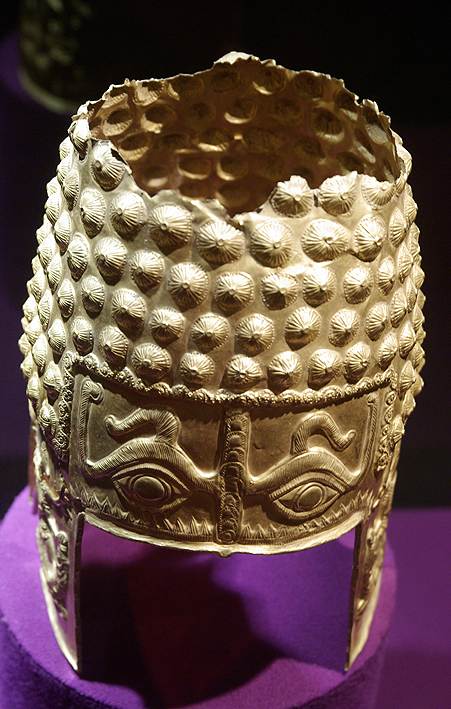
View with the damaged top

The helmet's decorations depict a range of mythical creatures, and an illustration, on either cheek-piece, of a ritual enactment.

The cheek-pieces show a ram being sacrificed by a man who kneels on its body and is about to cut its throat with a short knife. The iconography on the right side of the helmet is of a great interest, and has been interpreted in light of the tauroctony scene from the Mithraic Mysteries. Environment and affluence might well account for a change to a larger beast being offered as sacrifice and a similar interpretation of a bull-slaying episode. This sacrifice of the ram might have been performed by the "king-priest-god".

The pair of "Voracious Beasts" on the Coțofenești neck-guard occupy a lower register along with a similar creature deprived of a victim’s leg. This motif of the "Voracious Beast" is found earlier in Assyrian art, and was popular among the Etruscans. Phoenicia was probably the intermediary for its transferral to Italy and around the Adriatic, but the motif must also have traveled through Asia Minor to appear in a North Thracian idiom not only on the Coțofenești neck-guard but also in high relief on the base of the Aghighiol beakers, named after the village near the Danube Delta in eastern Romania where they were found.

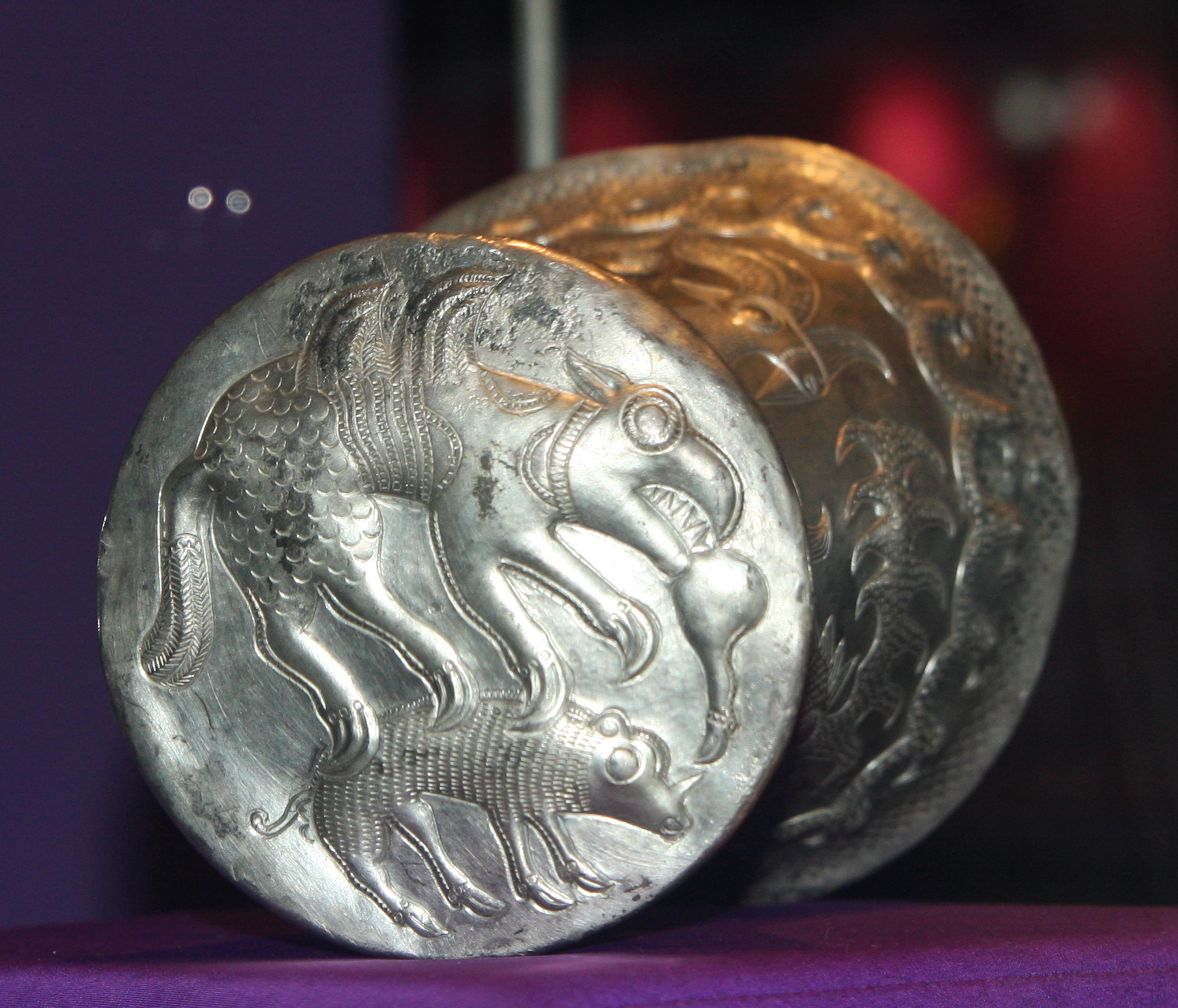
Silver beaker from Agighiol

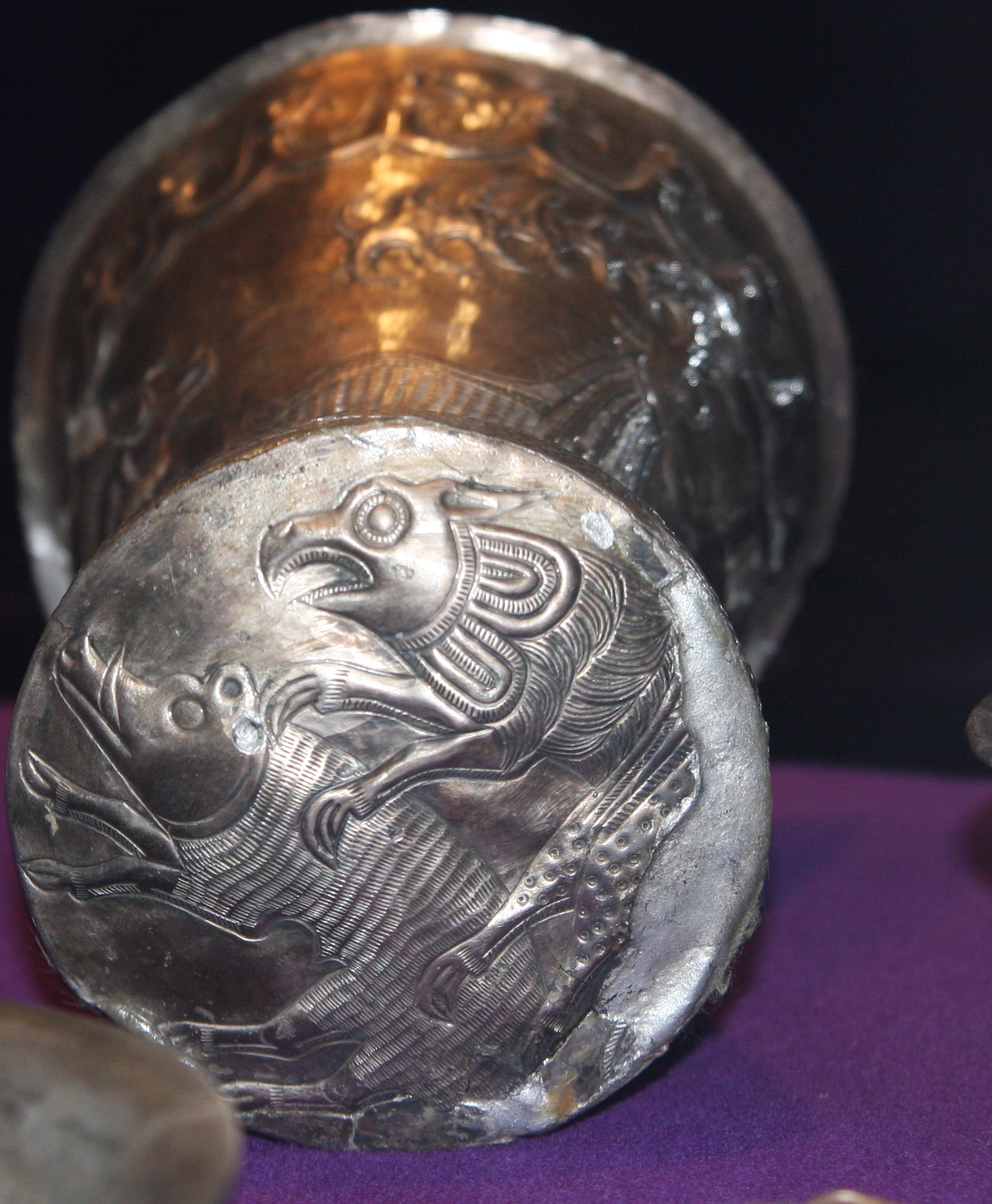
Silver beaker from Agighiol

The upper register displays a row of three seated or squatting winged creatures, rather monkey-like with human faces, long forearms, and long tails. These are direct, if run-down, descendants of the sphinxes on a gold beaker from Amlash.

The eyes on a Greek battle-shield may be designated to ward off evil blows, but once translated onto a helmet, and above the eyes of a North Thracian noble who wore it, they could mean "I see twice as well, I have eyes like my hawk". The Thracian gold and silversmiths who manufactured the objects were aware of other contemporary art styles—those of Scythia, Greece, northeast Italy, and what is now modern Slovenia were known through trade, travel, and meetings and they adapted conventions of representation suitable for their own purposes. The meaning of these motifs was no doubt context-specific.

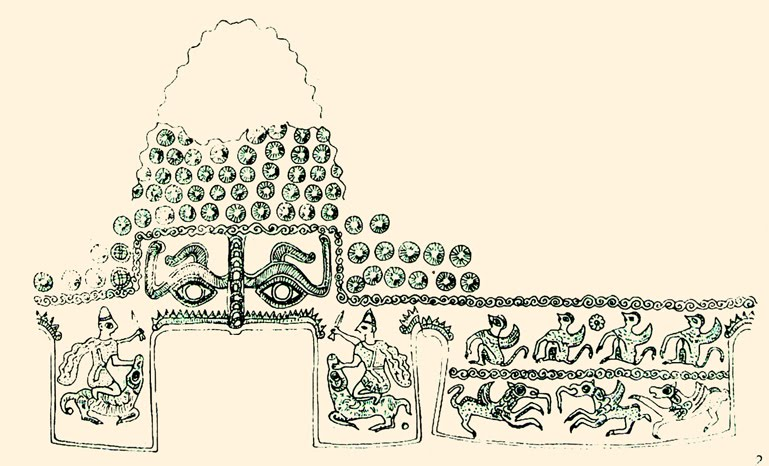
Drawing of the mythological scenes in full

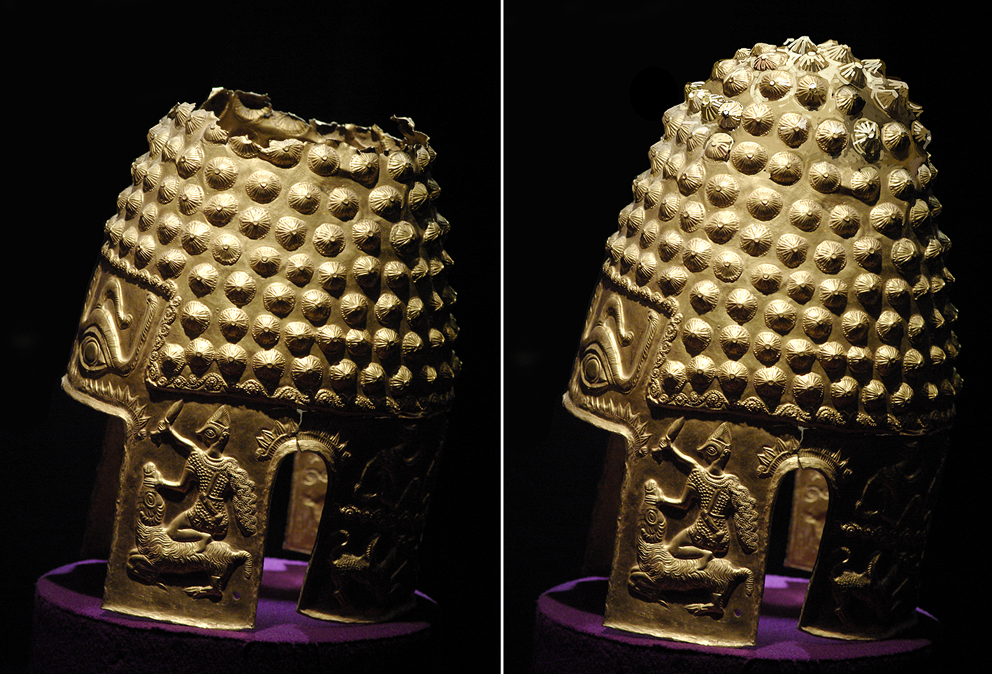
Graphic reconstruction of the damaged helmet, with the scene resembling a Mithraic tauroctony

The decorations, such as rosettes, strips, triangles, spirals, and others are specific Geto-Dacian art motifs. The depiction of the sacrifice of the ram is an Iranian theme that entered Greek art and from there 'barbarian' art. Therefore, the helmet seems to have been realized in a Greek workshop. But, in the same time the awkward technique of execution that contrasts with the perfect technique of a Greek craftsman points out to an autochthonous one.

== Theft ==
On January 25, 2025, Dutch officials announced the helmet had been stolen from the Drents Museum in Assen, where it had been on loan, along with three golden Dacian bracelets. Experts believed that the thieves intended to melt the artifacts. Its theft sparked criticism over the loan agreement in Romania, and on 28 January, the Romanian minister of Culture Natalia Intotero fired the museum's director, Ernest Oberländer, saying that he had "failed to adequately protect the national heritage".

On April 2, 2026, it was announced that the helmet and two out of the other three stolen artefacts have been recovered. The helmet was described as "slightly dented, but can be fully restored".

On 5 June 2026, Dutch media reported that one of the thieves, sentenced that day to nearly four years in prison, had used the infamy of the theft to sell merchandise referencing it, including T-shirts bearing an image of the golden helmet of Cotofenești.

== In popular culture ==
Incorrectly reconstructed replica, worn by Decebalus in the movie Dacii (The Dacians) (1967)

A replica of the helmet appeared in the 1967 historical movie Dacii (The Dacians) by Sergiu Nicolaescu, though it took place at least 500 years after the period to which the helmet has been dated. Worn by the Dacian king Decebalus, the movie helmet had a flat top, an inaccuracy that entered the vernacular of popular culture. The comic strips "Din zori de istorie", published in late 1970s in "Cutezătorii" magazine, written by Vasile Mănuceanu and drawn by Albin Stănescu, also depicts the helmet with a flat top. It is worn by the Getian king Odrix during the conflict with the Persian king Darius I, who in 513 BC, was campaigning against the Scythians. The action takes place within roughly the period that produced the original helmet. A similar comic strip written by Mănuceanu and drawn by Sandu Florea depicts the king Burebista wearing the helmet as well.

== See also ==
- Getae – Thracian tribe of modern northern Bulgaria and southern Romania
- Thracians – Indo-European people in ancient southeast Europe
