= 2025 Drents Museum heist =

Theft of artifacts in Assen, Netherlands

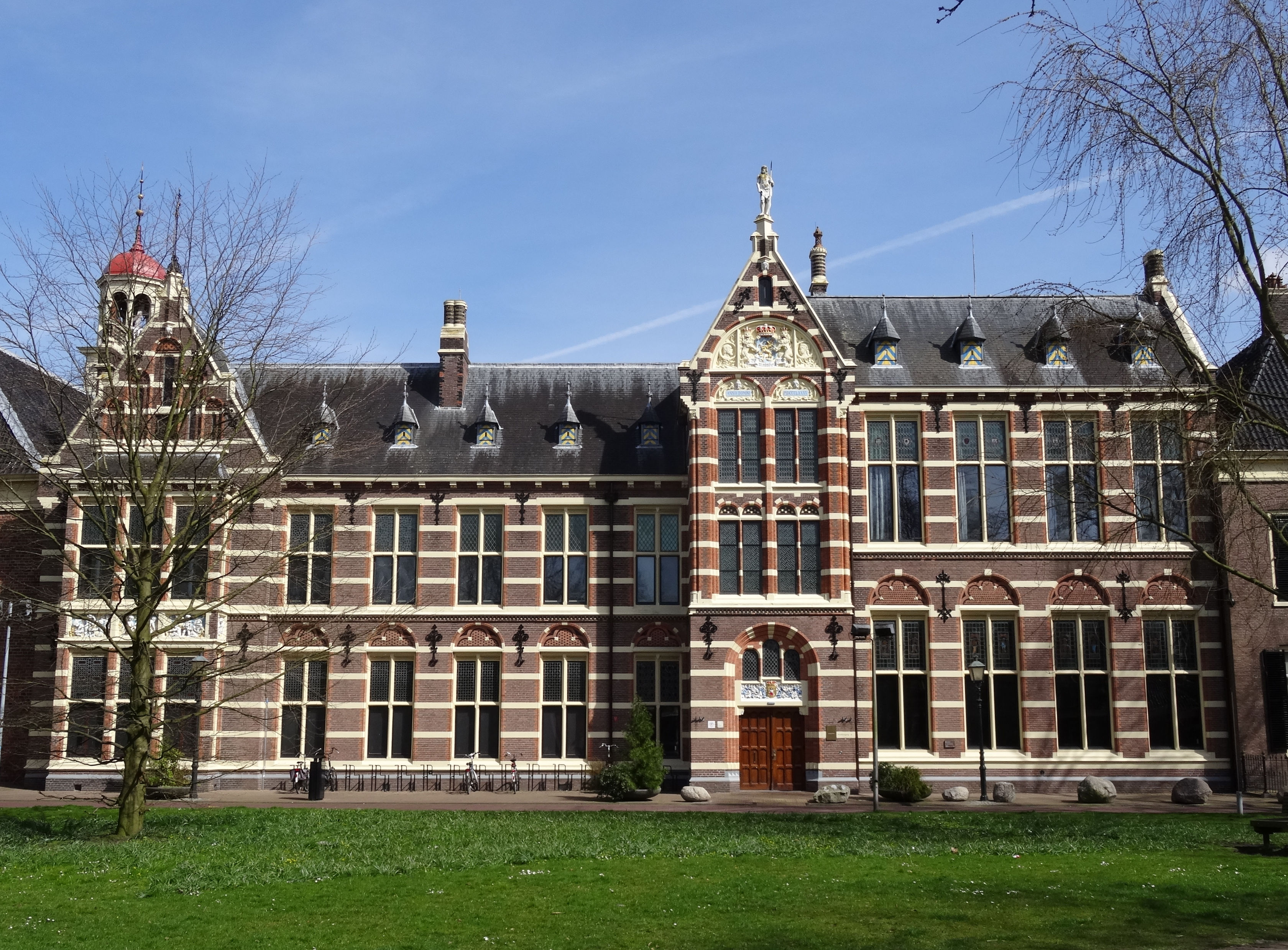
- The Drents Museum, where the robbery took place
- Date: 25 January 2025
- Time: 3:45 a.m.
- Venue: Drents Museum
- Location: Assen, the Netherlands; 52°59′33″N 6°33′54″E
- Outcome: €6 million worth of items stolen
- Property damage: Drents Museum due to the used explosives
- Suspects: Thieves from North Holland

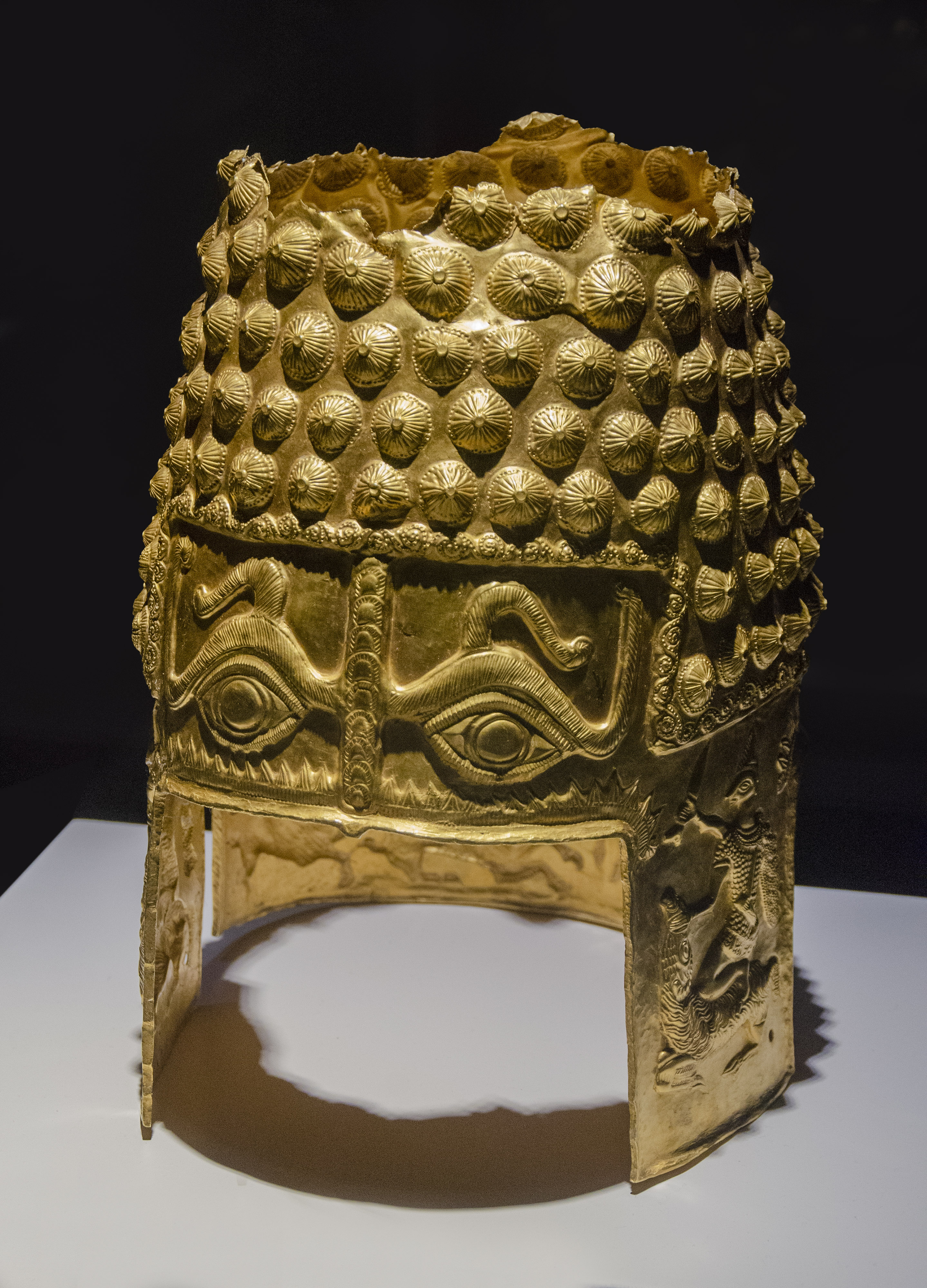
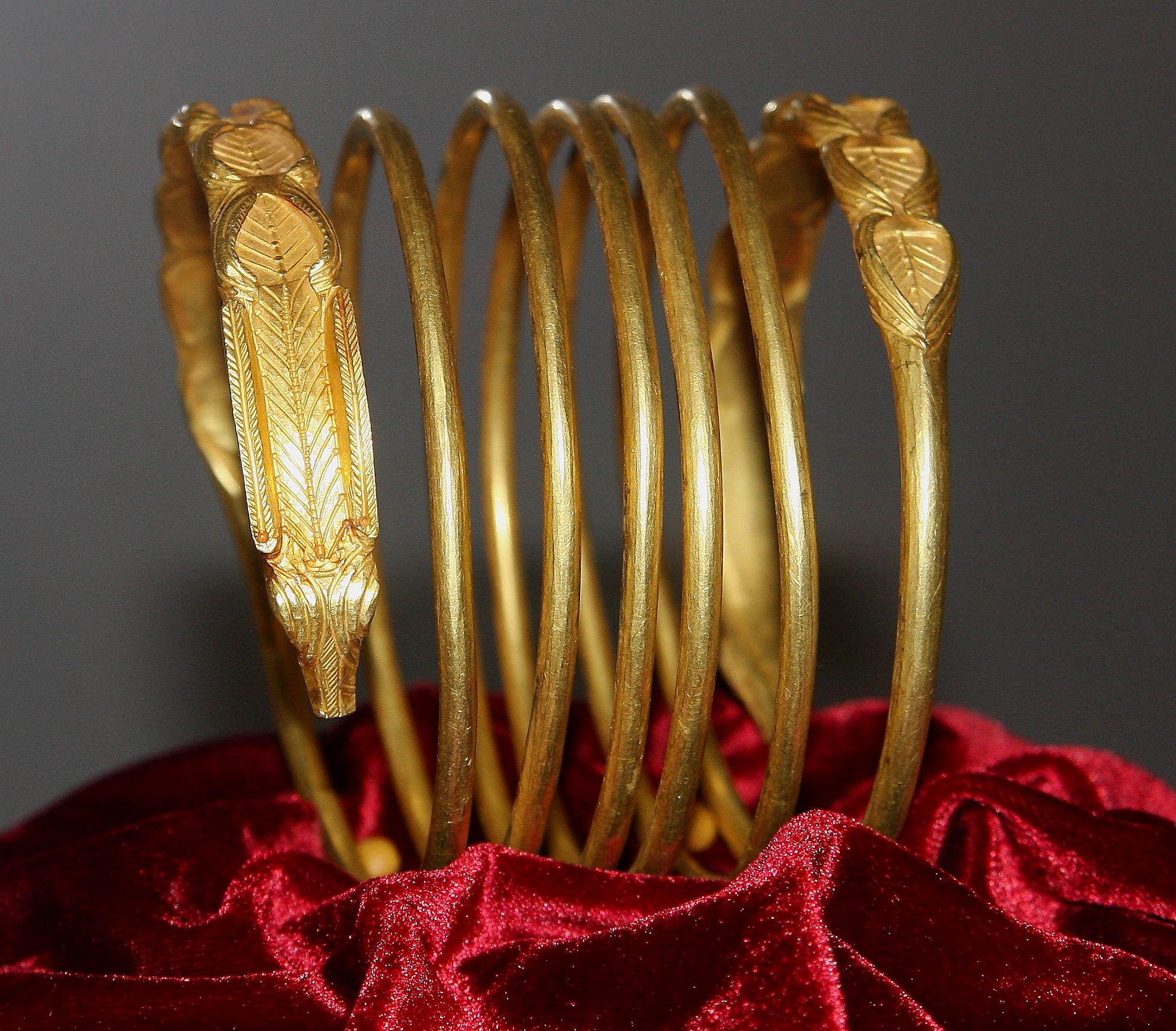
The Helmet of Coțofenești (left) and a Dacian bracelet similar to the stolen ones (right)

On 25 January 2025, a group of individuals forcibly entered the Drents Museum in Assen, Netherlands, using explosives and stole golden artifacts valued at approximately €6 million. The stolen items were irreplaceable archaeological treasures representing the Dacian civilization which thrived in present-day Romania before conquest by the Roman Empire in 106 AD. They include the Helmet of Coțofenești, with an estimated value of €4.3 million, and three gold bracelets from the Dacian royal collection. The exhibition, which had never before been displayed internationally at this scale, included items such as ceremonial jewelry and religious objects dating back to the 2nd century BC.

Romania's Ministry of Culture has vowed to do everything possible to retrieve the artifacts, which had been on loan to the Drents Museum from the National History Museum of Romania in Bucharest. Harry Tupan, director of the Drents Museum, expressed profound dismay at the theft, describing it as the most significant incident in the museum's 170-year history.

As a result, the Romanian Minister of Culture Natalia Intotero fired the director of the National History Museum in Bucharest.

On 2 April 2026 it was announced that the helmet and two of the three bracelets had been recovered.

== Incident ==
At approximately 3:45 a.m. local time on 25 January, police responded to reports of an explosion at the Drents Museum. There was no guard in the museum at the time of the theft. Security camera footage at the site later revealed three hooded people carrying a duffle bag, a crowbar and flashlights before the explosion. The items stolen were part of the exhibition titled "Dacia: Empire of Gold and Silver", featuring archaeological treasures from museums across Romania that was scheduled to close on January 26.

== Investigation ==
Forensic teams and investigators examined the site and analyzed CCTV footage throughout the day. Authorities also investigated a vehicle (dark gray Volkswagen Golf) found burning on a nearby road, suspecting it may have been connected to the crime. Next to that a Ford Transit was involved.

Dutch police indicated that it was plausible the perpetrators switched vehicles after abandoning the burning car, suggesting the involvement of multiple individuals in the heist. Interpol was contacted to assist with the case.

After the robbery investigations were conducted in Alkmaar, Witmarsum, Groningen, Assen and Rolde. In the television program Opsporing Verzocht, appeals were made to the people.

On January 27 a sledgehammer was found in the water on the museum grounds, which may have been used in the heist.

On January 28 it was announced that the suspects are from North Holland. The following day, the Dutch police arrested three suspects in Heerhugowaard, North Holland. They were tracked down after police found a bag that was left behind in a neighborhood in Assen, including clothes in it. Due to the importance of finding the stolen pieces, the police released the identity and images of two of the three suspects on January 30, which is very uncommon in the Netherlands in case of already arrested suspects. The two identified suspects were Douglas Chelsey Wendersteyt and Bernard Zeeman, both from Heerhugowaard. The identity of the third suspect, a woman also from Heerhugowaard, was not released. The home of a neighbor of the two named suspects – a Romanian woman – was searched as well, though police stated she is not a suspect. As of April 2025, two other suspects have been arrested, a 20-year-old man and an 18-year-old man, both from Heerhugowaard.

According to sources cited by RTL Nieuws, the helmet was stolen by criminals linked to the illegal outlaw motorcycle club Hardliners. The heist was on the instructions of a Romanian criminal who wanted to trade in the helmet for a reduced sentence, hence the helmet is likely still intact. However the helmet was reportedly dropped on the ground once during the heist.

On 9 May 2025, the first public hearing in the art theft case took place at the District Court in Assen. During the hearing, the Public Prosecution Service (OM) stated that there was an "abundance of evidence" against two suspects who, according to the prosecution, had been present during the theft. The prosecution also expressed the expectation that the stolen art treasures could still be recovered intact. The suspects declined to comment on the theft and invoked their right to remain silent. They also complained that their names and photographs had been made public.

== Aftermath ==
The Drents Museum was closed temporarily due to the theft and was reopened on 31 January. The remaining artifacts of the exhibition were returned to Romania.

On 27 January, Dutch minister of foreign affairs Caspar Veldkamp spoke to the Romanian minister of foreign affairs Emil Hurezeanu about the theft in Brussels. Veldkamp stated that "The Netherlands is doing everything it can to get the stolen objects back". Experts believe that the thieves intended to melt the artifacts.

The Dutch government will pay 5.7 million Euro to the Drents Museum following the theft.

=== Reactions in Romania ===
In Romania, the loan agreement was met with criticism. On 28 January, the Romanian Minister of Culture Natalia Intotero fired the director of the National History Museum of Romania, Ernest Oberländer-Târnoveanu, because he had "failed to adequately protect the national heritage". Minister of Finance Barna Tánczos said that the Romanian government was prepared to fund a potential ransom to recover the stolen artifacts.

Răzvan Pop, directory of Sibiu's ASTRA Museum wrote that the theft reignited interest of Romanians in their culture and heritage "for the first time in the last 20 years."

=== Recovery ===
On 2 April 2026, it was announced that the helmet had been found. During a press conference later the same day, it was revealed that the helmet along with two of the three stolen bracelets had been found in a good state after an investigation of 1 year and 2 months. The helmet was "slightly dented, but can be fully restored". The press conference, under strict police security, was held in the same museum the artifacts were stolen from, Drents Museum.

During a later trial it will be revealed what kind of deal was struck with the charged. On 5 June 2026, the Northern Netherlands District Court sentenced three people to 47 months' imprisonment for the heist.

=== Romania-Dutch relations ===
The theft also triggered a diplomatic dispute between the Netherlands and Romania. Among others, the Romanian Prime Minister threatened a multi-million-euro claim if the helmet and bracelets were not returned. The Netherlands pledged that every possible effort would be made to recover the stolen items.

== See also ==
- 2025 Louvre heist
- 2026 Musée Renoir theft
- Art theft
- Dresden Green Vault burglary
- Interpol
- List of hoards in Romania
- List of missing treasures
- Looted art
