= 1986 in association football =

The following are the association football events of the year 1986 throughout the world.

== Events ==
- March 11 – Germany's Sigfried Held makes his debut as the manager of Iceland, losing (1–2) against Bahrain.
- March 21 – Egypt wins the Africa Nations Cup in Cairo after defeating Cameroon on penalties (5–4) after a 0–0 draw after extra-time.
- June 22 – Diego Maradona scores a goal with his hand, calling it the "Hand of God goal".
- June 29 – In the final of the 1986 FIFA World Cup, played for the second time in Mexico City, Azteca Stadium, Argentina defeats West Germany 3–2 to win their second World Cup title.
- European Cup: Steaua București 0–0 Barcelona; Steaua București won 2–0 on penalties
- UEFA Cup: Two legs; 1st leg Real Madrid 5–1 1. FC Köln; 2nd leg 1.FC Köln 2–0 Real Madrid CF. Real Madrid CF won 5–3 on aggregate
- UEFA Cup Winners' Cup: Dinamo Kyiv 3–0 Atlético Madrid
- UEFA Super Cup: Steaua București 1–0 Dinamo Kyiv
- Copa Libertadores de América: Two legs; 1st leg América de Cali 1–2 River Plate; 2nd leg River Plate 1–0 América. River Plate won 3–1 on aggregate
- England – FA Cup: Liverpool won 3–1 over Everton
- England – Milk Cup (League Cup): Oxford United won 3–0 over Queens Park Rangers
- November 6 – Alex Ferguson is appointed manager of Manchester United
- December 14 – Argentina's River Plate wins the Intercontinental Cup in Tokyo by defeating Romania's Steaua București 1–0. The only goal is scored by Antonio Alzamendi in the 28th minute.

== Winners Club National Championship ==
=== Asia ===
- - Qatar – Al-Rayyan

=== Europe ===
- - Austria – Austria Wien
- - England – Liverpool
- (Finland) - FC Kuusysi
- - France – Paris Saint-Germain
- - Hungary – Budapest Honvéd
- (Republic of Ireland) - Ireland - Shamrock Rovers
- - Italy – Juventus
- - Netherlands - PSV Eindhoven
- - Portugal – Porto
- - Romania – Steaua București
- - Scotland – Celtic
- - Spain – Real Madrid
- - Turkey – Beşiktaş
- - West Germany – Bayern Munich

=== North America ===
- Canada – Toronto Blizzard (NSL)
- Mexico – Rayados de Monterrey
- United States – Hollywood Kickers (WSA)

=== South America ===
- - Argentina – River Plate
- - Bolivia – The Strongest
- - Brazil – São Paulo
- - Colombia – América de Cali
- - Paraguay – Sol de América

== International Tournaments ==
- African Cup of Nations in Egypt (March 7 – 21 1986)
  1. Egypt
  2. Cameroon
  3. Ivory Coast
- FIFA World Cup in Mexico (May 31 – June 29, 1986)
  1. Argentina
  2. West Germany
  3. France

== Births ==
=== January ===
- January 2
  - Ediz Bahtiyaroğlu, Turkish-Bosnian footballer (d. 2012)
  - Nicolás Bertolo, Argentinian footballer
- January 4
  - Younès Kaboul, French footballer
  - James Milner, English footballer
- January 7 — Grant Leadbitter, English footballer
- January 8
  - Jorge Claros, Honduran international footballer
  - David Silva, Spanish international footballer
- January 9
  - Jéferson Gomes, Brazilian footballer
  - Uwe Hünemeier, German footballer
- January 10 – Kenneth Vermeer, Dutch footballer
- January 17 – Mahamed Habib N'Diaye, Malian footballer
- January 18 – Maksim Berdnik, former Russian professional footballer
- January 19 – Yann Schneider, French footballer
- January 21 – Roman Stepanov, Ukrainian former footballer
- January 22 – David Martin, English footballer
- January 23 – Vusi Mthimkhulu, South African footballer
- January 24 – Oscar Centurión, Paraguayan footballer

=== February ===
- February 3
  - David Edwards, Welsh footballer
  - Gregory van der Wiel, Dutch footballer
- February 6 – Ismael Barragán, Spanish footballer
- February 10 – Roberto Jiménez, Spanish footballer
- February 15 – Aron Liechti, Swiss footballer
- February 19 – Marta, Brazilian footballer
- February 23 – Milena Vuković, Serbian footballer
- February 25 – Mikhail Malykhin, former Russian professional footballer

=== March ===
- March 4
  - Arturo Carbonaro, Italian footballer
  - Eldar Getokov, former Russian professional footballer
- March 16 — Boaz Solossa, Indonesian footballer
- March 19 — José Babak, Paraguayan footballer
- March 27 — Manuel Neuer, German international footballer
- March 12 — František Rajtoral, Czech international footballer (died 2017)
- March 31 — Tony McMahon, English footballer

=== April ===
- April 7 – Elton Jose Xavier Gomes, Brazilian footballer
- April 20 — Marcel Klefenz, German former footballer

=== May ===
- May 3 – Robin Hofman, Dutch former professional footballer
- May 4 – Sakatar Singh, Indian footballer
- May 10 – Emilio Izaguirre, Honduran footballer
- May 20 – Dexter Blackstock, Antiguan-English footballer
- May 27
  - Mario Mandžukić, Croatian footballer
  - Kristina Stolpovskaya, Kazakhstani former footballer
- May 30 – Sergei Nyukhalov, former Russian professional footballer

=== June ===
- June 7 – Olivier Uwingabire, Rwandan footballer
- June 14 – Nikita Lushin, former Russian professional footballer
- June 19 – Mahamoud Mroivili, Comorian international footballer
- June 23 – Mariano, Brazilian footballer
- June 24 – Jean, Brazilian footballer
- June 27 – Mohammed Sannie, Ghanaian footballer

=== July ===
- July 11 – Raúl García, Spanish footballer
- July 18 – Carlos Villa, Guatemalan professional footballer
- July 22 – Szymon Pawlak, Polish footballer
- July 22 – Ahmed Rahmatullah, Qatari footballer

=== August ===
- August 11 – Saad Al-Yami, Saudi Arabian footballer
- August 13 – Erald Hysi, Albanian footballer
- August 19 – Kamil Karcz, Polish footballer
- August 24 – Gabriel Noah, Cameroonian professional footballer
- August 26 – Ndidi Kanu, Nigerian footballer
- August 27 – Elina Johansson, Swedish footballer
- August 29 – Nicolás López, Uruguayan footballer

=== September ===
- September 7 — Scott Mulholland, English professional footballer
- September 21 — Roger Tchouassi, Rwandan footballer
- September 28 —
  - Andrés Guardado, Mexican footballer

=== October ===
- October 7 — Gunnar Nielsen, Faroese footballer
- October 13 — Bawa Mumuni, Ghanaian footballer
- October 21 — Edemir Rodríguez, Bolivian footballer

=== November ===
- November 5 — Ulbosin Zholchiyeva, Kazakhstani footballer
- November 7 — Flavia Schwarz, Swiss former footballer
- November 16 — Nacho Neira, Spanish footballer
- November 22 — Jakub Rondzik, Slovak footballer
- November 25 — Craig Gardner, English youth international and coach

=== December ===
- December 2 —
  - Claudiu Keșerü, Romanian footballer
  - Adam Le Fondre, English footballer
  - Piauí, Brazilian footballer (died 2014)
- December 4 — Kévin Gohiri, French professional footballer
- December 6 — Marijan Tomašić, Croatian footballer
- December 10 — Matthew Bates, English footballer, manager and coach
- December 19 — Ryan Babel, Dutch footballer
- December 28 — Igor Sani, Guinea-Bissauan international footballer

== Deaths ==
=== April ===
- 6 April – Raimundo Orsi, Argentine/Italian striker, winner of the 1934 FIFA World Cup. (84)

=== August ===
- 1 August – José María Vidal, Spanish footballer
