= José Manuel (given name) =

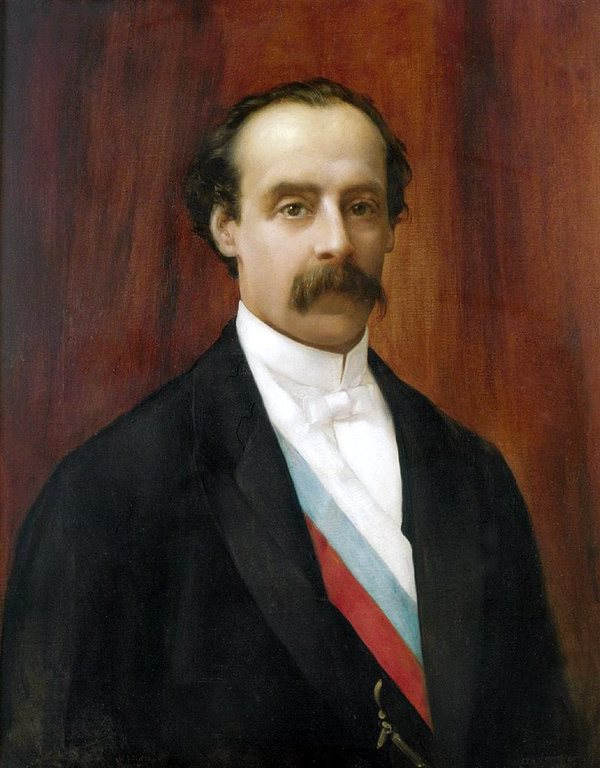
- José Manuel Balmaceda

Other names
- Variant forms: José Manoel (Archaic Portuguese); José Emanuel (Modern Portuguese)
- Anglicisation: Joseph Emmanuel
- Related names: José, Manuel

José Manuel is a masculine double name, the Portuguese and Spanish form of the English double name Joseph Emmanuel. The primary form of the name is Joseph-Emmanuel in French, and it is now present in several languages, such as Giuseppe Emanuele in Italian, and Josef Emanuel in German.

Notable people with the name include:

- José Manuel (footballer) (born 1973), Spanish football defender
- José Manuel Abascal (born 1958), Spanish 1500 m runner
- José Manuel Abdalá (1957–2014), Mexican journalist and politician
- José Manuel Abundis (born 1973), Mexican football forward
- José Manuel Agüero Tovar (born 1971), Mexican politician
- José Manuel Aguirre Miramón (1813–1887), Spanish jurist and politician
- José Manuel Aira (born 1976), Mexican football manager and defender
- José Manuel Albares (born 1972), Spanish diplomat
- José Manuel Albentosa (born 1965), Spanish long-distance runner
- José Manuel Alcañiz (born 1990), Spanish footballer
- José Manuel Andoin (1914–unknown), Spanish sports shooter
- José Manuel Angel (born 1948), Salvadoran football midfielder
- José Manuel Arcos (born 1974), Spanish pole vaulter
- José Manuel Nicolás Ayén (born 2003), Spanish footballer
- José Manuel Babak (born 1988), Paraguayan football midfielder
- José Manuel Balbiani (born 1978), Argentine racing driver
- José Manuel Balmaceda (1840–1891), Chilean president
- José Manuel Barreiro (born 1957), Spanish politician
- José Manuel Beirán (born 1956), Spanish basketball player
- José Manuel Bento dos Santos (born 1947), Portuguese cook and chemical engineer
- José Manuel Hernández (1853–1921), Venezuelan army general and politician
- José Manuel Tagle

== See also ==
- José Manuel (disambiguation)
