= Liechti =

Liechti is a surname. Notable people with the surname include:

- Alban Liechti (1935–2024), French anti-colonial activist
- Aron Liechti (born 1986), Swiss footballer
- Fabienne Liechti, Swiss-American dancer
- Jasmin Liechti (born 2002), Swiss cyclist
- Matthias Liechti (born 1970), Swiss scientist and physician
- Peter Liechti (1951–2014), Swiss film director
