= 2004–05 Queens Park Rangers F.C. season =

English football club season

Queens Park Rangers
2004–05 season
- Chairman: Bill Power
- Manager: Ian Holloway
- Stadium: Loftus Road (capacity 19,128)
- Football League Championship: 11th
- FA Cup: Third round
- League Cup: Second round
- Top goalscorer: League: Paul Furlong (18); All: Paul Furlong (19)
- Highest home attendance: 18,363 16 October 2004 West Ham United
- Lowest home attendance: 4,882 24 August 2004 Swansea City
- Average home league attendance: 16,055
- Biggest win: 4-1 Vs Coventry City (28 September 2004)
- Biggest defeat: 1-6 Vs Leeds United (20 November 2004)
Home colours	Away colours	Third colours

During the 2004–05 English football season, Queens Park Rangers F.C. competed in the inaugural season of the Football League Championship, having been promoted from the old Second Division (now renamed League One) the previous season.

== Season summary ==
After a slow start to the season, QPR enjoyed their best start to a season for 20 years and won seven games in a row to rise up to third in the Championship table, though the good form didn't last and the West London side eventually finished in a comfortable midtable position - 12 points from the relegation zone and 11 points off the play-off places.

QPR were eliminated from the League Cup in the second round by Premiership side Aston Villa and the FA Cup in the third round by fellow Championship side Nottingham Forest.

== Kit ==
Le Coq Sportif continued as QPR's kit manufacturers. Telecommunications company Binatone continued as kit sponsors.

== Final league table ==
Pos	Team	Pld	W	D	L	GF	GA	GD	Pts
9	Wolverhampton Wanderers	46	15	21	10	72	59	+13	66
10	Millwall	46	18	12	16	51	45	+6	66
11	Queens Park Rangers	46	17	11	18	54	58	−4	62
12	Stoke City	46	17	10	19	36	38	−2	61
13	Burnley	46	15	15	16	38	39	−1	60

Updated to match(es) played on 9 December 2011. Source: Football League Tables
Rules for classification: 1) points; 2) goal difference; 3) number of goals scored.

== Results ==
Queens Park Rangers' score comes first

=== Legend ===
Win	Draw	Loss

=== Championship ===
Date	Opponents	Venue	Result F–A	Scorers	Attendance	Position
7 August 2004	Rotherham United	H	1–1	Ainsworth 5'	14,547	11
9 August 2004	Watford	A	0–3		14,737	19
14 August 2004	Sunderland	A	2–2	Furlong 71', Rowlands 12'	26,063	23
21 August 2004	Derby County	H	0–2		15,295	23
27 August 2004	Gillingham	A	1–0	Bean 30'	7,391	19
31 August 2004	Sheffield United	H	0–1		13,804	20
11 September 2004	Plymouth Argyle	H	3–2	Furlong 29', 72', Gallen 89'	15,425	18
14 September 2004	Crewe Alexandra	A	2–0	Furlong 22', Santos 68'	5,682	12
18 September 2004	Brighton & Hove Albion	A	3–2	Gallen 16', Furlong 74', Rose 90'	6,612	8
25 September 2004	Leicester City	H	3–2	Cook 58', Furlong 70', 90'	15,535	7
28 September 2004	Coventry City	H	4–1	Cureton 32' 41'.74', Furlong 90'	14,680	4
2 October 2004	Stoke City	A	1–0	Gallen 69'	16,877	4
16 October 2004	West Ham United	H	1–0	Rose 22'	18,363	3
19 October 2004	Preston North End	A	1–2	Santos 8'	10,548	4
23 October 2004	Wolverhampton Wanderers	A	1–2	Gallen 90'	27,070	5
30 October 2004	Burnley	H	3–0	Gallen 13' (pen), Santos 16', Furlong 24'	15,638	4
2 November 2004	Millwall	H	1–1	Furlong 87'	16,685	5
6 November 2004	West Ham United	A	1–2	McLeod 72'	31,365	6
13 November 2004	Wigan Athletic	H	1–0	Furlong 86'	15,804	5
20 November 2004	Leeds United	A	1–6	Ainsworth 2'	29,739	5
27 November 2004	Cardiff City	H	1–0	Shittu 23'	15,146	5
4 December 2004	Nottingham Forest	A	1–2	Santos 49'	26,099	6
11 December 2004	Ipswich Town	H	2–4	Furlong 27', 30'	18,231	7
18 December 2004	Reading	A	0–1		20,272	10
26 December 2004	Plymouth Argyle	A	1–2	Furlong 53'	19,535	10
28 December 2004	Crewe Alexandra	H	1–2	Shittu 81'	15,770	13
1 January 2005	Brighton & Hove Albion	H	0–0		15,898	12
3 January 2005	Leicester City	A	0–1		23,754	13
14 January 2005	Stoke City	H	1–0	Cook 18'	13,559	11
22 January 2005	Coventry City	A	2–1	Cureton 32', Furlong 90'	16,595	10
5 February 2005	Millwall	A	0–0		15,603	11
12 February 2005	Preston North End	H	1–2	Furlong 26'	15,620	11
19 February 2005	Burnley	A	pp			
22 February 2005	Wolverhampton Wanderers	H	1–1	Gallen 11'	15,029	12
26 February 2005	Ipswich Town	A	2–0	Furlong 4', Shittu 75'	29,008	11
5 March 2005	Reading	H	0–0		16,971	12
12 March 2005	Watford	H	3–1	Furlong, 35' Gallen 45', 58'	16,638	11
16 March 2005	Derby County	A	0–0		24,486	11
19 March 2005	Rotherham United	A	1–0	Rowlands 53'	5,387	9
2 April 2005	Sunderland	H	1–3	Shittu 22'	18,198	9
5 April 2005	Gillingham	H	1–1	Furlong 54'	16,431	9
9 April 2005	Sheffield United	A	2–3	Rowlands 26', Gallen 66'	20,426	11
16 April 2005	Leeds United	H	1–1	Gallen 85'	18,182	12
19 April 2005	Burnley	A	0–2		10,396	12
23 April 2005	Wigan Athletic	A	0–0		12,007	13
30 April 2005	Nottingham Forest	H	2–1	Curtis 45'(own goal), Bircham 51'	17,834	11
8 May 2005	Cardiff City	A	0–1		15,722	11

=== FA Cup ===
Round	Date	Opponent	Venue	Result F–A	Attendance	Scorers
R3	8 January 2005	Nottingham Forest (Championship)	H	0–3	11,140	

=== Carling Cup ===
Round	Date	Opponent	Venue	Result F–A	Attendance	Scorers
R1	24 August 2004	Swansea City (League Two)	H	3–0	4,882	Cureton 39', Rowlands 77', Gallen90'
R2	22 September 2004	Aston Villa (FA Premiership)	A	1–3	26,975	McLeod 48'

=== Friendlies ===
Date		Opponents	Venue	Result F–A	Scorers	Attendance
14-Jul-04	Scotland	Nairn County v Queens Park Rangers	A			
17-Jul-04	Scotland	Inverness Caledonain Thistle v Queens Park Rangers	A			
21-Jul-04		Queens Park Rangers v Ajax	H			
27-Jul-04	Jamie Shore Testimonial	Bristol Rovers v Queens Park Rangers	A			
31-Jul-04		Queens Park Rangers v Crystal Palace	H			
30-Nov-04		Brentford v Queens Park Rangers	A			

== Squad ==
Position	Nationality	Name	League		FA Cup		League Cup		Total	
Position	Nationality	Name	Apps	Goals	Apps	Goals	Apps	Goals	Apps	Goals
GK	ENG	Chris Day	30		1		2		33	
GK	ENG	Simon Royce	13						13	
GK	ITA	Generoso Rossi	3						3	
DF	CIV	Arthur Gnohere	3				1		4	
DF	ENG	Terrell Forbes	2				1		4	
DF	ENG	Matthew Rose	24	2					24	2
DF	ENG	Marcus Bignot	41				2		45	
DF	ENG	Lewis Hamilton							1	
DF	ENG	Andrew Davies							9	
DF	ENG	Richard Edghill	13		1		1		22	
DF	USA	Frankie Simek	5						5	
DF	ARG	Gino Padula	28				1		35	
DF	NGA	Danny Shittu	33	4	1		2		37	4
DF	DRC	Pat Kanyuka	1						1	
DF	CAM	Serge Branco	3		1		1		9	
DF	ENG	Marcus Bean	20	1	1		1		22	1
MF	CPV	Georges Santos	39	5			2		45	5
MF	ENG	Adam Miller	9						14	
MF	ENG	Richard Johnson	6				1		7	
MF	ENG	Martin Rowlands	31	3	1		2	1	38	4
MF	ENG	Marc Bircham	32	1			1		33	1
MF	ENG	Kevin McLeod	4	1			2	1	27	2
MF	ENG	Scott Donnelly					1		2	
MF	ENG	Gareth Ainsworth	14	2	1				23	2
MF	ENG	Lee Cook	38	2			2		44	2
MF	ENG	Stefan Bailey	1						2	
FW	ENG	Paul Furlong	39	18			2		41	18
FW	ENG	Dean Sturridge							2	
FW	ENG	Scott Mulholland							1	
FW	ENG	Tony Thorpe	4		1				11	
FW	ENG	Shabazz Baidoo	2						3	
FW	ENG	Jamie Cureton	18	4	1		2	1	33	5
FW	ENG	Luke Townsend							2	
FW	ENG	Aaron Brown							1	
FW	ENG	Kevin Gallen	46	10	1		2	1	49	11

== Reserve squad ==
Note: Flags indicate national team as defined under FIFA eligibility rules; some limited exceptions apply. Players may hold more than one non-FIFA nationality.

No.	Pos.	Nation	Player
13	GK	ENG	Jake Cole
26	DF	ENG	Ryan Johnson
28	DF	ENG	Dominic Shimmin

No.	Pos.	Nation	Player
33	DF	ENG	Matthew Hislop
36	DF	ENG	Daniel Murphy

== Transfers Out ==
Name	from	Date	Fee	Date	Club	Fee
Ben Walshe	Queens Park Rangers Juniors	June2001		July 4, 2004	St.Albans	Free
Dennis Oli	Queens Park Rangers Juniors	June 20, 2002		August 2004	Swansea City	
Wes Daly	Queens Park Rangers Juniors	August 2001		August 2004	Raith Rovers	Loan
Luke Townsend	Queens Park Rangers Juniors			September 2004	Northwoods	Loan
Richard Pacquette	Queens Park Rangers Juniors	February 2000		September 2004	Milton Keynes Dons	
Terrell Forbes	West Ham	July 13, 2001	Free	September 2004	Grimsby	Free
Richard Johnson	Watford	February 2004		October 2004	Milton Keynes Dons	Loan
Frankie Simek	Arsenal	Oct 19, 2004	Loan	Nov 04	Arsenal	Loan
Jack Perry	Stockport	Dec2003	Free	Nov 04	Estoril Praia (Por)	Free
Richard Johnson	Watford	Feb 17, 2004	Free	Dec 04	Newcastle Jets (Aus)	Free
Leon Best	Southampton	Dec 17, 2004	Loan	Jan 05	Southampton	Loan
Serge Branco	Leeds	Sep 20, 2004	Free	Jan 05	FC Shinnik (Rus)	Free
Andrew Davies	Middlesbrough	Jan 12, 2005	Loan	February 2005	Middlesbrough	Loan
Kevin McLeod	Everton	Aug 18, 2003	£250,000	February 2005	Swansea	£75,000
Wes Daly	Queens Park Rangers Juniors	June2002		February 2005	Grays Athletic	Free
Chris Day	Watford	July 2001		February 2005	Preston North End	Loan
Marcus Bean	Queens Park Rangers Juniors	July 2002		February 2005	Swansea City	Loan
Aaron Brown	Bristol City	July 2004		March 2005	Torquay United	Loan
Tony Thorpe	Luton Town	August 2003	£50,000	March 2005	Rotherham United	Loan
Andrew Davies	Middlesbrough	Mar 14, 2005	Loan	Apr 05	Middlesbrough	Loan
Nick Culkin	Manchester U	July 9, 2002	Free	Apr 05	Retired (Knee injury)	
Simon Royce	Charlton	Jan 13, 2005	Loan	Apr 05	Charlton	Loan
Arthur Gnohere	Burnley	Feb 18, 2004	£75,000	May 5	Istres (France)	Free

== Transfers In ==
Name	from	Date	Fee
Patrick Kanyuka	Queens Park Rangers Juniors	July 2004	
Scott Donnelly	Queens Park Rangers Juniors	July 2004	
Shabazz Baidoo	Queens Park Rangers Juniors	July 2004	
Stefan Bailey	Queens Park Rangers Juniors	July 2004	
Lee Cook	Watford	July 5, 2004	£180,000
Georges Santos	Ipswich Town	August 2004	
Lewis Hamilton	Derby	Aug 6, 2004	Free
Serge Branco	Leeds	Sep 20, 2004	Free
Frankie Simek	Arsenal	Oct 19, 2004	Loan
Adam Miller	Aldershot Town	Nov 13, 2004	£45,000
Aaron Brown	Bristol C	Dec 17, 2004	Free
Leon Best	Southampton	Dec 17, 2004	Loan
Andrew Davies	Middlesbrough	Jan 12, 2005	Loan
Simon Royce	Charlton	Jan 13, 2005	Loan
Generoso Rossi	Siena (Ita)	Jan 31, 2005	Free
Pat Kanyuka	Leyton Orient	Feb 2, 2005	
Matthew Hislop	Arsenal	Mar 7, 2005	Free
Andrew Davies	Middlesbrough	Mar 14, 2005	Loan
Dean Sturridge	Wolverhampton	Mar 18, 2005	Free
Dominic Shimmin	Arsenal	Mar 24, 2005	£10,000
Luke Townsend	Queens Park Rangers Juniors	Apr 05	
Scot Mulholland	Queens Park Rangers Juniors	Apr 05	
Simon Royce	Charlton	May 25, 2005	Free
Ryan Johnson	Queens Park Rangers Juniors	June 2005	
Ian Evatt	Chesterfield	June 2, 2005	£150,000
Stefan Moore	Aston Villa	June 13, 2005	Free
Tommy Doherty	Bristol C	June 29, 2005	£80,000
