= José Manuel =

José Manuel may refer to:

- José Manuel (given name)
- José Manuel (footballer, born 1973), José Manuel Colmenero Crespo, Spanish football right midfielder
- José Manuel (footballer, born 2003), José Manuel Nicolás Ayén, Spanish football midfielder
