= Malykhin =

Malykhin (Russian: Малыхин) is a Russian masculine surname, its feminine counterpart is Malykhina. Notable people with the surname include:

- Anatoly Malykhin (born 1988), Russian mixed martial artist and wrestler
- Fedor Malykhin (1990–2025), Russian ice hockey player
- Mikhail Malykhin (born 1986), Russian footballer
