= Ndidi =

Nigerian given name

- Gender: Female
- Language: Igbo

Origin
- Origin: Igbo
- Meaning: Patience
- Region of origin: Igboland

Ndidi // is an Igbo female given name meaning "patience".

== Given name ==
- Ndidi Okonkwo Nwuneli (born 1975) Nigerian entrepreneur
- Ndidi Onukwulu (born 1988) Nigerian British Canadian singer-songwriter
- Ndidi Dike (born 1960) Nigeria-based visual artist
- Ndidi Winifred (born 1988) Nigerian weightlifter
- Ndidi Ekubia (born 1973) British silversmith
- Ndidi Emefiele (born 1987) Nigerian contemporary artist and painter
- Ndidi Nwosu (1979 – 2020) Nigerian powerlifter
- Ndidi Kanu (born 1986) Nigerian footballer
- Ndidi Madu (born 1989) American-born Nigerian basketball player
- Ndidi Nnoli-Edozien (born 1972) Nigerian social entrepreneur and corporate sustainability and responsibility (CSR) expert

== Surname ==
- Wilfred Ndidi (born 1996) Nigerian professional footballer
