= Vusi =

Vusi or Vusimuzi is a given name. Notable people with the name include:

- Vusi Dube (born 1952 or 1953), South African politician and minister
- Vusi Khoza, South African politician
- Vusi Kunene, South African actor
- Vusi Lamola (born 1950), South African footballer
- Vusi Mahlasela (born 1965), South African singer-songwriter
- Vusi Malinga (born 1979), South African boxer
- Vusi Mkhatshwa (born 1979, South African politician
- Vusi Mthimkhulu (born 1986), South African footballer
- Vusi Nhlapo (born 1956), South African politician
- Vusi Nova (born 1984), South African singer
- Vusi Pikoli (born 1958), South African advocate
- Vusi Shongwe (born 1958), South African politician
- Vusi Sibanda (born 1983), South African cricketer
- Vusi Sibiya (born 1994), South African footballer
- Vusi Thanda (born 1951), South African actor
- Vusi Thembekwayo (born 1985), South African author and businessman
- Vusi Tshabalala, South African politician
- Vusi Ximba (1939–2011), South African singer-songwriter and comedian
- Vusumzi Make (1931–2006), South African civil rights activist and lawyer
- Vusie Payi (Masters graduate - University of the Western Cape)
