= Alban Liechti =

French anti-colonial activist (1935–2024)

- Born: 24 April 1935; Paris, France
- Died: 29 August 2024 (aged 89)
- Citizenship: French
- Occupation: Activist

Alban Liechti (24 April 1935 – 29 August 2024) was a French anti-colonial militant. He was the first French soldier to refuse to bear arms against the Algerian people.

== Biography ==
=== Early life ===
Alban Liechti was born in Paris in 1935, into a family of militant communists. He began selling the newspaper l'Humanité in 1948, and attended a French Communist Party school. In 1950, he joined the Union des jeunesses républicaines de France (U.J.R.F.), becoming its secretary.

Liechti was an active campaigner against the war in Indochina, notably for the release of Henri Martin and Raymonde Dien. In 1951, he was arrested during a demonstration against General Eisenhower. In May 1952, he was injured and hospitalized during a demonstration against General Ridgway. On 19 June 1953, he also took part in the demonstration, which degenerated into clashes, in front of the American embassy. Finally, on 14 July 1954, he marched with his parents in a demonstration during which Algerians and French were injured.

=== Refusal to fight in the Algerian war ===
In June 1956, Liechti's regiment was informed of its imminent departure for Algeria, but Liechti refused to bear arms against the Algerian people. On 2 July 1956, soldier Liechti wrote to the President of the Republic: "I cannot take up arms against the Algerian people fighting for their independence. By refusing to take part in this unjust war, I intend to contribute to preserving the possibility of freely agreed relations, based on mutual interests and respect for the rights of our two peoples [Algerian and French], and to bring closer the moment when war will finally give way to negotiation." On 5 July 1956, Liechti was nevertheless sent to fight in Algeria where he was imprisoned on 6 July 1956, in a regimental prison, for refusing to obey orders. On 19 November 1956, he was sentenced to two years' imprisonment by the Algiers military court for refusal to obey orders. He was then incarcerated at the Algiers penitentiary and, from 26 January 1957, at the Berrouaghia penitentiary.

A campaign calls for Liechti to be transferred to France. On 14 March 1957, Perdriau, from the Ministry of Justice's Office for the Enforcement of Sentences, asked the Minister resident in Algeria "to kindly inform [the Ministry of Justice], after consulting the military authorities, if there are any objections to the [transfer] measure requested". Lastly, the Ministry of Justice emphasized that if Liechti agreed to the transfer, he could be taken to metropolitan France with one of the next convoys of Algerians. On 19 March 1957, the Minister resident in Algeria agreed and stipulated that Liechti would be transferred to metropolitan France on 27 March 1957. Liechti was transferred to the Baumettes prison in Marseille until 30 April 1957, then to the Carcassonne prison, where he was held in solitary confinement. On 3 March 1959, Liechti refused a second time to take part in the Algerian war. He was again imprisoned and sentenced to two years' imprisonment on 26 May 1959. However, after these two years of detention, Liechti and the soldiers of refusal still had to serve the remainder of their military service. Alban Liechti was taken to Algeria on 17 March 1961, his second conviction dating from 1959. This time, like the other soldiers of refusal, he agreed to do his military service and served the remainder of his term. Liechti was finally released from his military obligations on 8 March 1962 (ten days before the Evian agreements).

=== Campaign in support of Liechti ===
Liechti's imprisonment led to a debate within the Communist Party, which culminated, a few months later, in the launch of a campaign in support of Liechti. Some forty Communist soldiers also decided to refuse to bear arms. These soldiers were grouped together under the term "movement of the imprisoned", or the "soldiers of refusal", an expression they themselves used. This movement took place between 2 July 1956, the date of Liechti's letter to the President of the Republic, and 18 May 1959, the date of Jean-Louis M.'s letter to the President of the Republic. Some of them were therefore detained until 1961. Nearly 12,000 conscripts refused, in one way or another, to take part in this war, i.e., 1% of all conscripts.

=== Life after the war ===
After the war, Liechti was a gardener in Trappes, where he was in charge of green spaces from 1975 until his retirement in 1995. He was amnestied in 1966 under Law no. 66-396 of 17 June 1966, granting amnesty for offenses against State security or committed in connection with events in Algeria.

In 2000, he signed "l'appel des 12", calling for recognition and condemnation of the torture practiced by France during the Algerian War.

=== Death ===
Liechti died on 29 August 2024, at the age of 89.

== Personal life ==
Liechti married his wife Yolande in 1958 after his first liberation, shortly before refusing to take up arms for the second time.

His son Vincent was born in 1959, Alban Liechti was unable to attend the birth because his requests for exceptional temporary releases from prison were systematically refused.
