= Mumuni =

Mumuni is a Ghanaian name that may refer to

Given name

- Mumuni Abudu Seidu, Ghanaian politician
- Mumuni Bawumia, Ghanaian politician and writer
- Mumuni Koray (died 1953), Ghananian royalty

Surname

- Abdul Mumuni (born 1973), Ghanaian football forward
- Abdul Salam Mumuni, Ghanaian filmmaker
- Bawa Mumuni (born 1986), Ghanaian football player
- Muhammad Mumuni (born 1949), Ghanaian lawyer and politician
