= Sannie =

Sannie is both a given name and a surname. Notable people with the name include:

- Mohammed Sannie (born 1986), Ghanaian footballer
- Sannie Carlson (born 1970), Danish singer-songwriter with Italian dance act Whigfield
- Sannie Overly (born 1966), American lawyer, engineer, and politician

== See also ==
- Nannie
