= Sanny =

Sanny or Sannie is a given name, nickname and surname. It may refer to:

== Given name ==
- Sanny Åslund (born 1952), Swedish football coach and former player
- Sannie Carlson (born 1970), stage name Whigfield, Danish singer, songwriter, record producer and actress
- Sanny Dahlbeck (born 1991), Swedish welterweight kickboxer
- Sanny van Heteren (born 1977), German actress
- Sanny Lindström (born 1979), former Swedish Hockey League player
- Sanny Monteiro (born 1989), Dutch former footballer
- Sannie Overly (born 1966), American lawyer, engineer and politician
- Sanny Weitner, Dutch contestant in the Miss World 1952 beauty pageant

== Nickname ==
- Frank Jacobsson (1930–2017), Swedish footballer
- Alex Dick (1894–1958), Scottish footballer
- Alex McAnespie, Scottish former football player (1964–1978) and manager (1987–1996)
- Michael "Sanny" Santangelo, a character on The Wire

== Surname ==
- Charles Sannié, who held the Chair for Chemistry as Applied to Organic Compounds from 1941 to 1957 - see List of Chairs of the Muséum national d'histoire naturelle
- Lorne Sanny (1920–2005), President of The Navigators Christian para-church organization after the death of founder Dawson Trotman
- Mohammed Sannie (born 1986), Ghanaian football goalkeeper
- Omar Sanny, footballer in Israel - see List of 2007–08 Israeli football transfers

== See also ==
- Sanny, Australian slang for hand sanitizer
- Sannies, a Scottish name for Plimsoll shoes
- "The sanny", local nickname for Holloway Sanatorium, near Virginia Water, Surrey, England
