= Glafiro Salinas Mendiola =

Mexican politician (1946–2025)

- Born: 31 May 1946; Nuevo Laredo, Tamaulipas, Mexico
- Died: 2 September 2025 (aged 79)
- Occupation: Politician
- Political party: PAN
- Spouse: Susana I. Salinas
- Children: Ricardo A. Salinas and Eduardo R. Salinas

Glafiro Salinas Mendiola (31 May 1946 – 2 September 2025) was a Mexican politician affiliated with the National Action Party (Spanish: Partido Acción Nacional, PAN).

Glafiro Salinas was born on 31 May 1946 in Nuevo Laredo, Tamaulipas. He held a degree in business management from the Autonomous University of Tamaulipas (UAT), where he later taught and served as the director of the Faculty of Commerce and Management.

In the 2012 general election, he was elected to the Chamber of Deputies to represent Tamaulipas's 1st district during the 62nd session of Congress. He later served in the Congress of Tamaulipas from 2016 to 2021.

Salinas Mendiola died on 2 September 2025, at the age of 79.
