= Cristabell Zamora =

Mexican politician

- Born: 16 November 1979 (age 46); Ciudad Victoria, Tamaulipas, Mexico
- Occupation: Politician
- Political party: PRI (1995-2024); MORENA (2024)

Cristabell Zamora Cabrera (born 16 November 1979) is a Mexican politician. In the 2009 mid-terms, she was elected to the Chamber of Deputies on the Institutional Revolutionary Party (PRI) ticket to represent Tamaulipas's 1st district during the 61st session of Congress.
