= 1st federal electoral district of Tamaulipas =

Federal electoral district of Mexico

Tamaulipas's 1st
- Electoral district of the Chamber of Deputies of Mexico

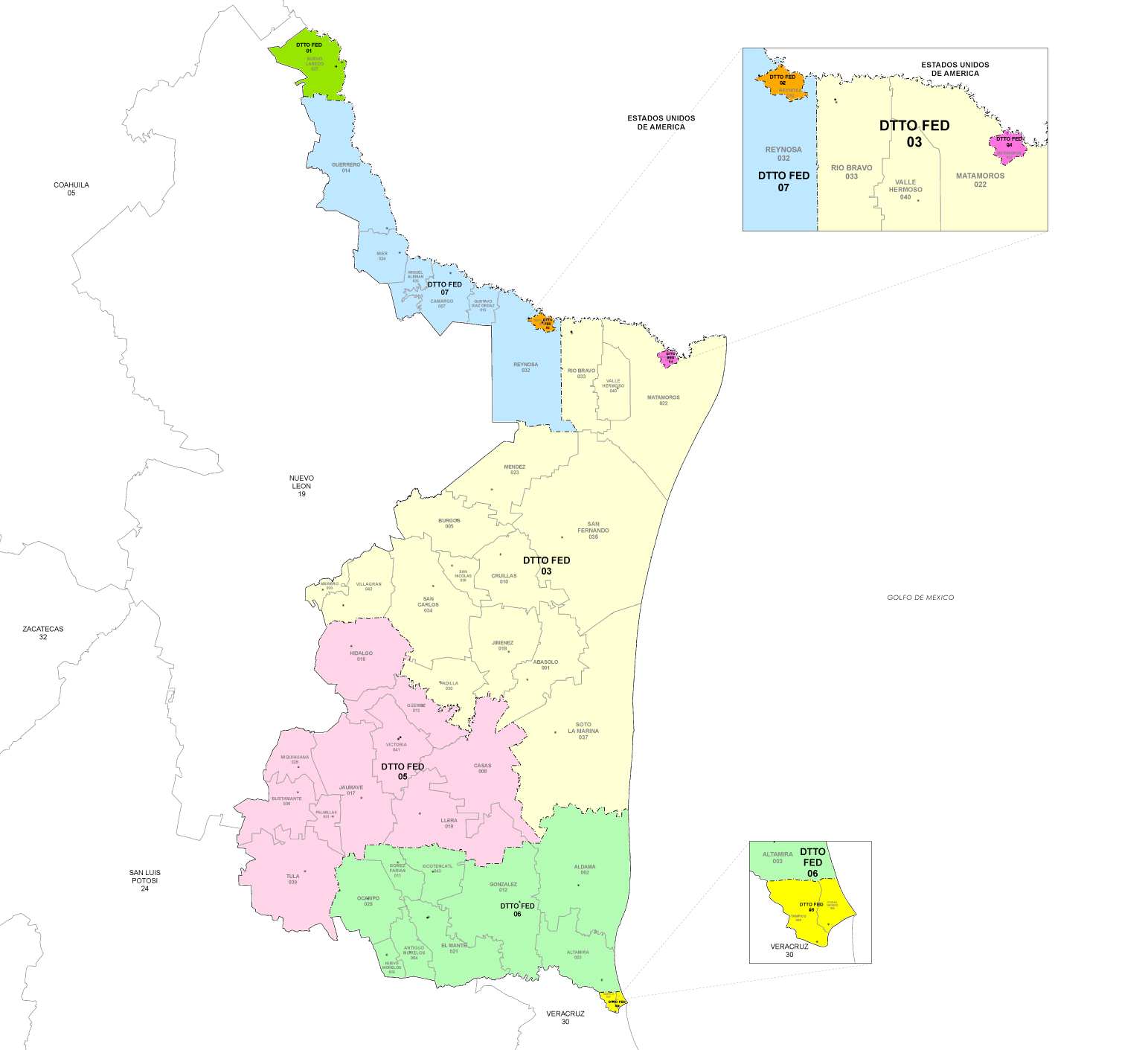
- 1st district since 2023

Incumbent
- Member: Carlos Canturosas
- Party: ▌Ecologist Green Party
- Congress: 66th (2024–2027)

District
- State: Tamaulipas
- Head town: Nuevo Laredo
- Coordinates: 27°29′N 99°30′W
- Covers: Municipality of Nuevo Laredo
- PR region: Second
- Precincts: 210
- Population: 425,055 (2020 census)

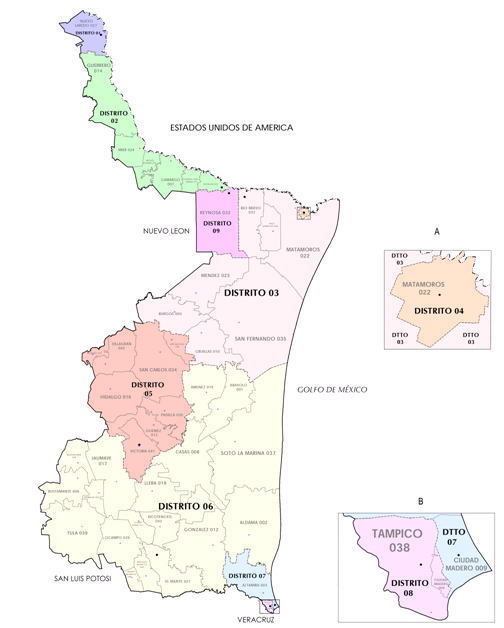
Tamaulipas's districts in 2017–2022

The 1st federal electoral district of Tamaulipas (Spanish: Distrito electoral federal 01 de Tamaulipas) is one of the 300 electoral districts into which Mexico is divided for elections to the federal Chamber of Deputies and one of eight such districts in the state of Tamaulipas.

It elects one deputy to the lower house of Congress for each three-year legislative session by means of the first-past-the-post system. Votes cast in the district also count towards the calculation of proportional representation ("plurinominal") deputies elected from the second region.

The current member for the district, elected in the 2024 general election, is Carlos Enrique Canturosas Villarreal of the Ecologist Green Party of Mexico (PVEM).

== District territory ==
Tamaulipas lost a district in the 2023 districting plan adopted by the National Electoral Institute (INE), which is to be used for the 2024, 2027 and 2030 federal elections; the 1st district, however, was not affected. It covers the entirety of the municipality of Nuevo Laredo in the state's extreme north.

The head town (cabecera distrital), where results from individual polling stations are gathered together and tallied, is the city of Nuevo Laredo. The district, comprising 210 electoral precincts (secciones electorales), reported a population of 425,055 in the 2020 census.

== Previous districting schemes ==
Evolution of electoral district numbers
	1974	1978	1996	2005	2017	2023
Tamaulipas	6	9	8	8	9	8
Chamber of Deputies	196	300				

2017–2022

Between 2017 and 2022, Tamaulipas accounted for nine single-member congressional seats. The 1st district's head town was at Nuevo Laredo and it covered that city and its surrounding municipality (206 precincts).

2005–2017

Under the 2005 plan, Tamaulipas had eight districts. This district's head town was at Nuevo Laredo and it covered 208 precincts across five municipalities:
- Camargo, Guerrero, Mier, Miguel Alemán and Nuevo Laredo.

1996–2005

In the 1996 scheme, under which Tamaulipas lost a single-member seat, the district had its head town at Nuevo Laredo and it comprised six municipalities:
- Camargo, Guerrero, Mier, Miguel Alemán and Nuevo Laredo as in the 2005 plan, plus Gustavo Díaz Ordaz.

1978–1996

The districting scheme in force from 1978 to 1996 was the result of the 1977 electoral reforms, which increased the number of single-member seats in the Chamber of Deputies from 196 to 300. Under that plan, Tamaulipas's seat allocation rose from six to nine. The 1st district covered the municipality of Nuevo Laredo.

== Deputies returned to Congress ==
(Mexico) National parties
- Current
- PAN
- PRI
- PT
- PVEM
- MC
- Morena
- PAZ
- Somos
- Defunct or local only
- PLM
- PNR
- PRM
- PNM
- PP
- PPS
- PARM
- PFCRN
- CON
- PANAL
- PSD
- PES
- PES
- PRD

Tamaulipas's 1st district
Election	Deputy	Party	Term	Legislature
1916	Pedro A. Chapa		1916–1917	Constituent Congress of Querétaro
...
1973	Carlos Enrique Cantú Rosas	Authentic Party of the Mexican Revolution	1973–1976	49th Congress
1976	Abdón Rodríguez Sánchez	Institutional Revolutionary Party	1976–1979	50th Congress
1979	Pedro Pérez Ibarra	Institutional Revolutionary Party	1979–1982	51st Congress
1982	Ascensión Martínez Cavazos	Institutional Revolutionary Party	1982–1985	52nd Congress
1985	Carlos Enrique Cantú Rosas	Authentic Party of the Mexican Revolution	1985–1988	53rd Congress
1988	Jesús González Bastien	Authentic Party of the Mexican Revolution	1988–1991	54th Congress
1991	Horacio Emigdio Garza Garza	Institutional Revolutionary Party	1991–1994	55th Congress
1994	Daniel Covarrubias Ramos	Institutional Revolutionary Party	1994–1997	56th Congress
1997	Antonia Mónica García Velázquez	Institutional Revolutionary Party	1997–2000	57th Congress
2000	Arturo San Miguel Cantú	National Action Party (Mexico)	2000–2003	58th Congress
2003	José Manuel Abdalá de la Fuente	Institutional Revolutionary Party	2003–2006	59th Congress
2006	Horacio Emigdio Garza Garza	Institutional Revolutionary Party	2006–2009	60th Congress
2009	Cristabell Zamora Cabrera	Institutional Revolutionary Party	2009–2012	61st Congress
2012	Glafiro Salinas Mendiola	National Action Party (Mexico)	2012–2015	62nd Congress
2015	Yahleel Abdala Carmona	Institutional Revolutionary Party	2015–2018	63rd Congress
2018	José Salvador Rosas Quintanilla	National Action Party (Mexico)	2018–2021	64th Congress
2021	Ana Laura Huerta Valdovinos	Ecologist Green Party of Mexico	2021–2024	65th Congress
2024	Carlos Enrique Canturosas Villarreal	Ecologist Green Party of Mexico	2024–2027	66th Congress

== Presidential elections ==
Tamaulipas's 1st district
Election	District won by	Party or coalition	%
2018	Andrés Manuel López Obrador	Juntos Haremos Historia	40.1948
2024	Claudia Sheinbaum Pardo	Sigamos Haciendo Historia	52.2608
