= José Manuel Abdalá =

Mexican politician

Deputy of the Congress of the Union for the 1st district of Tamaulipas
- In office 1 September 2003 – 31 August 2006
- Preceded by: Arturo San Miguel Cantú
- Succeeded by: Horacio Garza Garza

Personal details
- Born: 15 June 1957 Nuevo Laredo, Tamaulipas, Mexico
- Died: 10 July 2014 (aged 57)
- Party: PRI
- Occupation: Journalist and politician

José Manuel Abdalá de la Fuente (15 June 1957 – 10 July 2014) was a Mexican journalist and politician affiliated with the Institutional Revolutionary Party (PRI). In the 2003 mid-terms, he was elected to the Chamber of Deputies to represent Tamaulipas's 1st district during the 59th session of Congress.

He died during a lengthy hospitalization on 10 July 2014.
