= Raymonde Dien =

French communist activist (1929–2022)

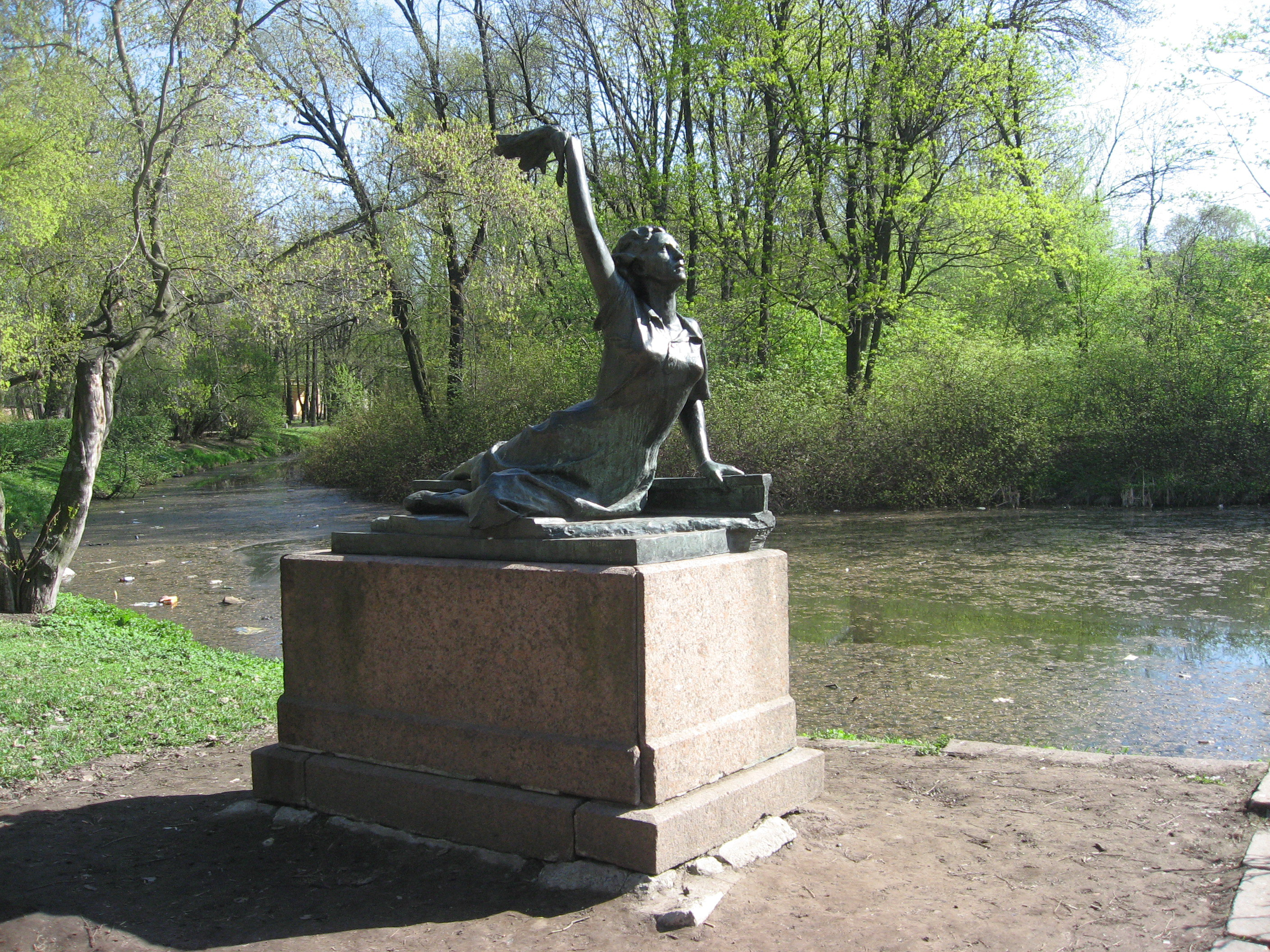
Statue of Dien in the Moskovsky Victory Park in Saint Petersburg

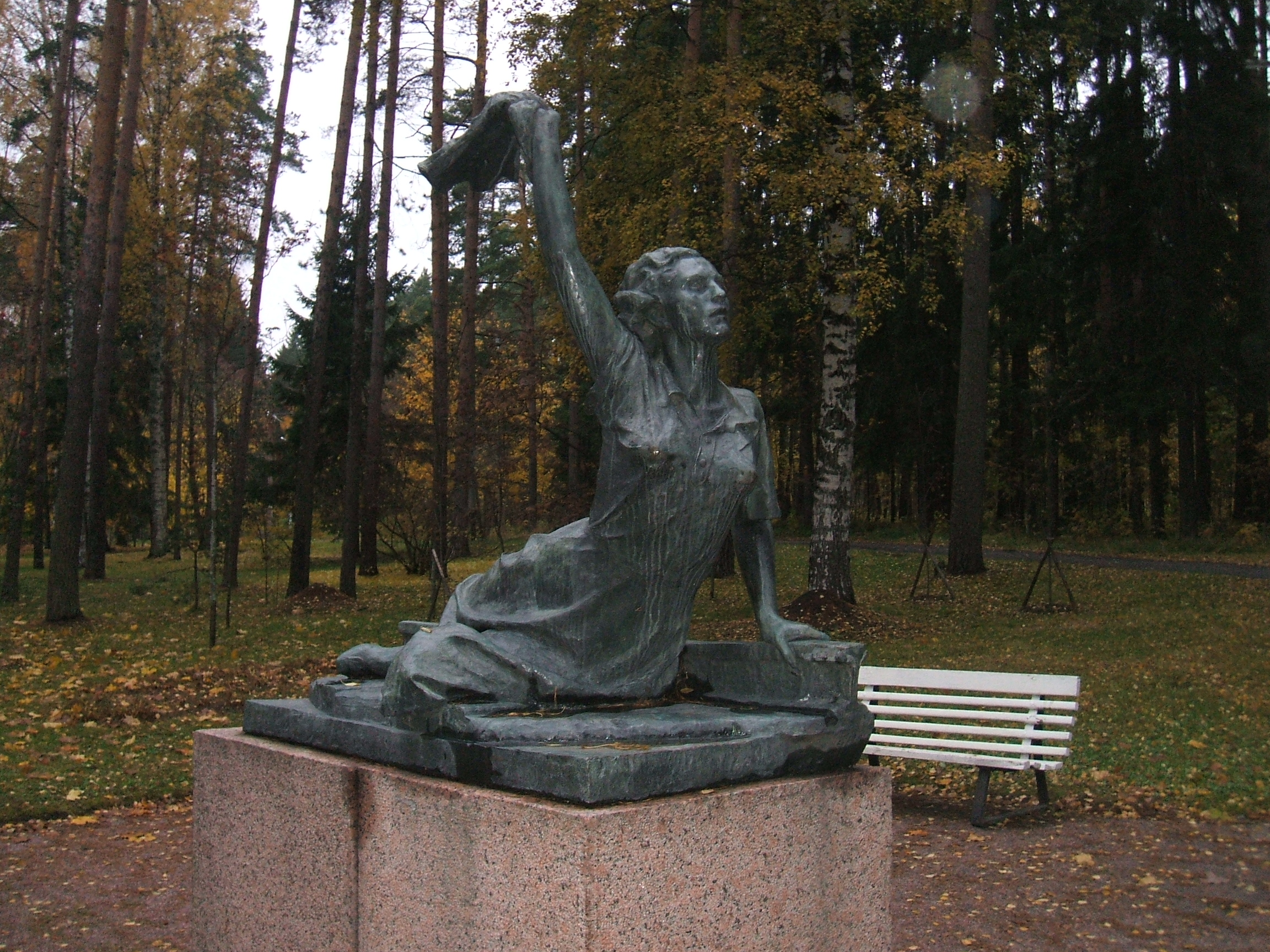
Copy of the statue of Dien, in Zelenogorsk, Saint Petersburg

Raymonde Dien (née Huberdeau; 13 May 1929 – 19 August 2022) was a French communist activist. She became known for being imprisoned for ten months in 1950 after a protest against the Indochina War.

== Life ==
On 23 February 1950, Raymonde Dien, a shorthand typist, participated in an improvised demonstration, alongside several hundred other members and supporters of the French Communist Party. They demonstrated at the train station of Saint-Pierre-des-Corps, in order to slow down a military train transporting armoured vehicles destined for Indochina. The crowd occupied the train tracks, and some participants lay down on them. Once the demonstration was over, the military personnel in charge of the convoy signalled a woman wearing trousers to the police forces. She was arrested by the police. They matched her to the description and had witnesses recognize her. They accused her of having lain down on the tracks.

She was imprisoned in Tours. She was the only demonstrator to be prosecuted; the secretary of the railroaders' section of the CGT, a French trade union associated with the Communist Party, also imprisoned, was freed after three weeks. She was prosecuted for "participation in an act of deterioration of equipment susceptible to be used for national Defense." She was transferred to the Fort of Hâ in Bordeaux, where she was incarcerated with two ex-secretaries of the Gestapo.

The lawyer Marie-Louise Jacquier-Cachin defended her, but a military court condemned her after a two-day trial, on 1 June 1950, to a year in prison and fifteen years of deprivation of civic rights.

Her trial was politically motivated. Alongside Henri Martin, she became a symbol of the opposition to the Indochina War. A campaign to support her was organised in France and in communist countries. Maurice Thorez, general secretary of the Communist Party, declared his support to both Henri Martin and her, and they also became part of an activist song: "Henri Martin, Raymonde Dien / Don't want us to kill the Vietnamese / They love peace so much / That they are suspect to the judges."

Raymonde Dien was freed on Christmas in 1950. Between 1953 and 1958, she was one of the leaders of the Union des jeunes filles de France ('Union of Young Women of France'), the women's branch of the PCF's youth organization.

Dien died on 19 August 2022, at the age of 93.

== Tributes ==
- In Vietnam:
  - In 2004, Raymonde Dien was awarded the Vietnamese Medal of Friendship.
  - A street of Ho Chi Minh City is named after her.
- In the Soviet Union:
  - In 1953, Valerian Kirhoglani created a statue of Dien, which is erected in the Moskovsky Victory Park in Saint Petersburg. The statue represents Dien lying down on train tracks. There is a copy of this statue in Zelenogorsk.
  - In 1950, a passage of Sergei Prokofiev's and Samuil Marshak's oratorio On Guard for Peace pays her hommage.
- In France : A street in Saint-Pierre-des-Corps is named 23 February 1950 street.
- In Poland: Wisława Szymborska wrote a poem about Dien called Tarcza ('Shield') which appeared in her debut book Dlatego żyjemy ('That's Why We Are All Alive').

== See also ==
- Henri Martin affair
