= Roman Stepanov =

Ukrainian footballer (born 1986)

Personal information
- Full name: Roman Anatoliyovych Stepanov
- Date of birth: 21 January 1986 (age 40)
- Place of birth: Ukrainian SSR, Soviet Union
- Height: 1.90 m (6 ft 3 in)
- Position: Midfielder

Youth career
- 1999–2004: Volyn Lutsk

Senior career*
Years	Team	Apps	(Gls)
2003–2006	Volyn Lutsk	11	(0)
2003	→ Kovel-Volyn Kovel	6	(0)
2004	→ Ikva Mlyniv (loan)	11	(1)
2006	→ Hazovyk-Skala Stryi (loan)	6	(0)
2007	Dinamo Brest	6	(0)
2008	ODEK Orzhiv	3	(1)
2009	Enerhetyk Burshtyn	20	(1)
2011	Lviv	4	(0)
2013–2015	Laska Boratyn		
2017	Volyn Lutsk	14	(1)

International career
2001	Ukraine U16	3	(0)
2002–2003	Ukraine U17	6	(4)
2003–2004	Ukraine U18	11	(0)
2004–2005	Ukraine U19	4	(0)
- * Club domestic league appearances and goals as of 3 April 2018

Roman Anatoliyovych Stepanov (Ukrainian: Роман Анатолійович Степанов; born 21 January 1986) is a Ukrainian former professional footballer who most recently played for FC Volyn Lutsk.

== Career ==
Stepanov previously played for FC Dinamo Brest in Belarus.

== Personal life ==
His son Artem Stepanov is also a professional footballer playing for Bayer 04 Leverkusen.
