= José Babak =

Paraguayan footballer (born 1986)

Personal information
- Full name: José Manuel Babak
- Date of birth: 19 March 1986 (age 40)
- Place of birth: Fram, Paraguay
- Height: 1.75 m (5 ft 9 in)
- Position: Midfielder

Youth career
- Guarani

Senior career*
Years	Team	Apps	(Gls)
2008–2009	Guarani	3	(0)
2009–2010	2 de Mayo	6	(0)
2010–2012	Boca Unidos	39	(0)
2012–2013	Patronato	23	(0)
2014	Sportivo Luqueño		
2014	Chaco For Ever	11	(0)
- * Club domestic league appearances and goals as of 4 September 2009

José Manuel Babak (born 19 March 1986 in Fram, Paraguay) is a Paraguayan football midfield who formerly played for 2 de Mayo, and in 2012 for Boca Unidos in Argentina.

== Teams ==
- Guaraní 2007
- 2 de Mayo 2008
- Guaraní 2009–2010
- Boca Unidos 2010–2012
- Patronato 2012–2013
- Sportivo Luqueño 2014
- Chaco For Ever 2014-
