= Maksim Berdnik =

Russian footballer

Personal information
- Full name: Maksim Viktorovich Berdnik
- Date of birth: 18 January 1986 (age 40)
- Place of birth: Pyatigorsk, Russian SFSR
- Height: 1.78 m (5 ft 10 in)
- Position: Midfielder

Senior career*
Years	Team	Apps	(Gls)
2002	Volgar-Gazprom-2 Astrakhan	15	(1)
2003	Dynamo Petushki		
2004	Zheleznodorozhnik Mineralnye Vody		
2005	Kavkaztransgaz Ryzdvyany		
2006	FBK Kaunas		
2007	Šilutė	12	(1)
2007–2009	Dnepr Mogilev	49	(10)
2010	Tekstilshchik Ivanovo	9	(1)
2010	Dynamo Stavropol	10	(1)
2011	Vitebsk	7	(0)
2011–2012	Dnepr Mogilev	29	(2)
2013	Granit Mikashevichi	6	(0)
2013	Mashuk-KMV Pyatigorsk	18	(1)
2014	Chayka Peschanokopskoye		
2015	Dnepr Mogilev	19	(2)
2016	Spartak Budyonnovsk		
- * Club domestic league appearances and goals

Maksim Viktorovich Berdnik (Russian: Максим Викторович Бердник; born 18 January 1986) is a former Russian professional footballer.
