= Roger Tchouassi =

Rwandan footballer

Personal information
- Date of birth: 21 September 1986 (age 40)
- Place of birth: Douala, Cameroon
- Height: 1.80 m (5 ft 11 in)
- Position: Forward

Senior career*
| Years | Team | Apps | (Gls) |
| 200x–2011 | Police Kibungo | | |
| 2011–2012 | Djibouti Télécom | | |
| 2012 | Al-Shabab SC | | |
| 2013–2014 | Al-Khaburah Club | | |

International career
| 2010– | Rwanda | 2 | (0) |
- * Club domestic league appearances and goals

Roger Tchouassi (born 21 September 1986 in Côte d'Ivoire) is a Rwandan footballer.

== Career ==
He played for the Police Kibungo and Djibouti Télécom. He made his international debut for Rwanda in 2010.
