= Sergei Nyukhalov =

Russian footballer

Personal information
- Full name: Sergei Vladimirovich Nyukhalov
- Date of birth: 30 May 1986 (age 40)
- Height: 1.86 m (6 ft 1 in)
- Position: Defender

Senior career*
Years	Team	Apps	(Gls)
2003	FC Spartak-Avto Moscow		
2004–2007	FC Sportakademklub Moscow	64	(4)
2008	FC Tekstilshchik Ivanovo	33	(0)
2009	FC Chita	11	(0)
2010	FC Akzhayik	17	(1)
2011	FC Istra	15	(0)
- * Club domestic league appearances and goals

Sergei Vladimirovich Nyukhalov (Russian: Серге́й Владимирович Нюхалов; born 30 May 1986) is a former Russian professional football player.

== Club career ==
He played in the Russian Football National League for FC Chita in 2009.
