= Horacio Garza Garza =

Mexican politician

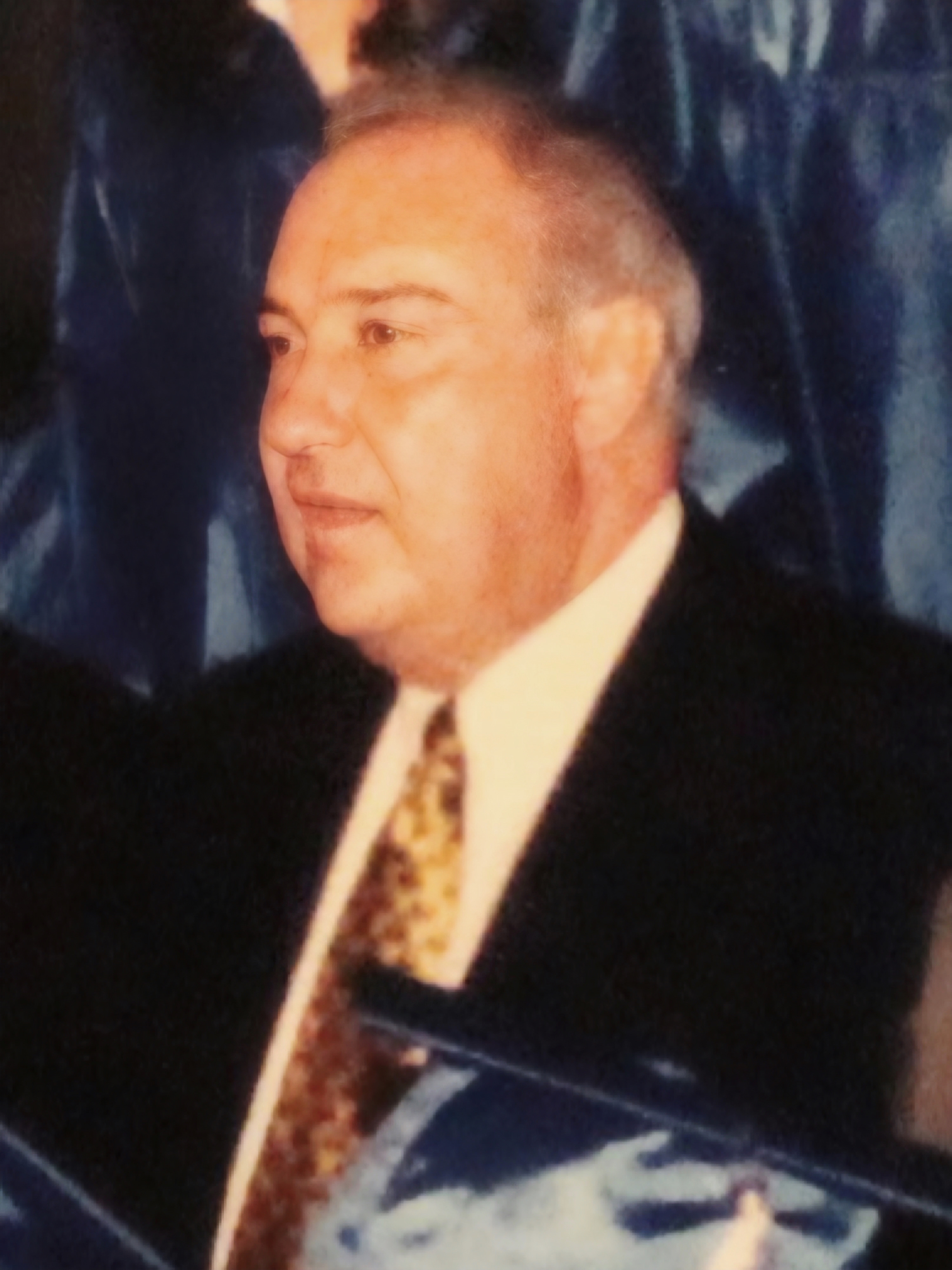
Horacio Garza Garza in June 2000.

Horacio Emigdio Garza Garza is a Mexican politician from Tamaulipas affiliated with the Institutional Revolutionary Party (PRI) who has served as municipal president of Nuevo Laredo and as a federal deputy.

== Political career ==
From 1991 to 1993, he served as the federal deputy for Tamaulipas's 1st district during the 55th Congress. He served as municipal president (mayor) of Nuevo Laredo twice, first from 1993 to 1995 and then from 1999 to 2001. From 2002 to 2004, he served as local deputy in the Congress of Tamaulipas. In 2006, he returned to the lower house of Congress for Tamaulipas's 1st, hence was elected to serve during the 60th Congress.

Garza has occupied several positions in the Tamaulipas public service.

== Assassination attempt ==
In February 2007 Garza was shot and critically wounded by unknown individuals as he was going to Quetzalcóatl International Airport to take a flight back to Mexico City. Garza's driver was shot to death. Garza was rushed to a hospital in Nuevo Laredo and then to a hospital in Mexico City.
