= Kévin Gohiri =

French footballer (born 1986)

Personal information
- Date of birth: 4 December 1986 (age 39)
- Place of birth: Paris, France
- Height: 1.78 m (5 ft 10 in)
- Position: Midfielder

Team information
- Current team: LB Châteauroux
- Number: 19

Senior career*
Years	Team	Apps	(Gls)
2003–2004	Lille (B team)		
2004–2005	Guingamp (B team)		
2005–2006	Le Mans (B team)		
2006–2007	US Créteil-Lusitanos (B team)		
2007–2009	US Créteil-Lusitanos		
2009–	LB Châteauroux	6	(0)
- * Club domestic league appearances and goals as of 18:02, 12 November 2009 (UTC)

Kévin Gohiri (born 4 December 1986) is a French professional footballer. He currently plays in the Ligue 2 for LB Châteauroux.
