= Moskovsky Victory Park =

Park in Saint Petersburg, Russia

Coordinates: 59°52′09″N 30°19′43″E

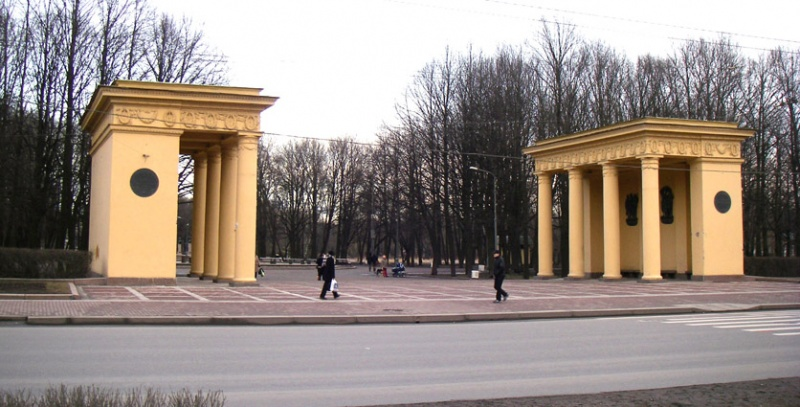
Propylaea in Moskovsky Victory Park.

Moskovsky Victory Park (Московский парк Победы, Moskovsky park Pobedy) is a public park in the Moskovsky District of Saint Petersburg, Russia. The name of the park was given in honor of victory in the Second World War.

Victory Park is situated in the south part of Saint Petersburg and bounded by Kuznetsovskaya Street, Moskovsky Avenue, Yuri Gagarin Avenue, Basseynaya Street. The address of the park administration is Kuznetsovskaya Street, 25. It covers an area of 168 acres (0.68 km^{2}).

Victory Park was created as the area redevelopment of the former site of the brick factory soon after the Second World War ended. The factory site and surrounding area carried a sorrowful reminder for surviving citizens. During the war, the factory facilities were used to cremate victims of German blockade and bombardments during the Siege of Leningrad. The ashes were transported in mine cars and dumped in the nearby flooded pits. The brick factory was located less than a mile from Russian front-line positions along one of the city's major routes - International Avenue (now Moskovsky Avenue) - close to the south outskirts of the city. Several pictures taken by Nazi aerial reconnaissance in one of the harsh winters during the Siege shows that the crematory facility was heavily used as seen by markings on snow-covered area. Estimates on how many victims were cremated there widely range from at least 117,000 to over 600,000 bodies. Soon after the Second World War, the factory building was erased and the area was redeveloped into a park.

Victory Park was officially opened on July 7, 1946, and covered only the 1/7 of the present-day territory. During the next decade, the park grew to the present boundaries. The original quarries, trenches and foxholes were preserved and further developed into a system of channels and small ponds. In the 1950s, construction projects in the park were led by the Soviet architects Yevgeniy Katonin and Valerian Kirhoglani. They created a summer stage, fountains and several pavilions, including two propylaea-like buildings at the main entrance. In further years, sculptures and monuments were installed throughout the park. A major alley called "Alley of Heroes" features busts of Soviet heroes, hence the name. Among statuaries in the park are the monument dedicated to Soviet marshal Georgy Zhukov and statues of the Soviet war heroes Zoya Kosmodemyanskaya and Alexander Matrosov. In the 1990s, the Orthodox chapel and commemorative plaque were erected at the former site of the crematory facility.

The park has several entertainment options including a small amusement park, playgrounds, cafés, boat rental, mini-golf, tennis courts and an outdoor ice skating rink. Transportation to the park is provided by the Park Pobedy Metro station at the south-west edge of the park.
