= Marijan Tomašić =

Croatian footballer

Marjan Tomašić
Personal information
- Full name: Marjan Tomašić
- Date of birth: 6 December 1986 (age 39)
- Place of birth: Rijeka, Croatia
- Height: 1.85 m (6 ft 1 in)
- Position: Goalkeeper

Senior career*
Years	Team	Apps	(Gls)
2003–2005	Rijeka	0	(0)
2005–2006	Orijent	25	(0)
2006–2007	Novalja	28	(0)
2007–2009	Pomorac Kostrena	12	(0)
2009	Skënderbeu Korçë	16	(0)
- * Club domestic league appearances and goals

Marjan Tomašić (born 6 December 1986) is a Croatian footballer who plays as a goalkeeper.

== Career ==
Tomašić was born in Rijeka. He has formerly played for KF Skënderbeu Korçë in the Albanian Superliga and in his homeland in Croatia for HNK Rijeka, HNK Orijent 1919, NK Novalja and NK Pomorac.
