= Kamil Karcz =

Polish footballer

Personal information
- Date of birth: 19 August 1986 (age 40)
- Place of birth: Wadowice, Poland
- Height: 1.80 m (5 ft 11 in)
- Position: Midfielder

Team information
- Current team: LKS Jawiszowice
- Number: 11

Youth career
- Beskidy Andrychów

Senior career*
Years	Team	Apps	(Gls)
2004	Skawinka Skawina		
2004	Pogoń Miechów		
2005–2007	Cracovia II		
2007–2010	Cracovia	2	(0)
2008–2009	→ Stal Stalowa Wola (loan)	25	(2)
2010–2011	Beskid Andrychów	16	(7)
2011	Znicz Pruszków	13	(1)
2012–2014	LKS Czaniec		
2014–2018	BKS Stal Bielsko-Biała	117	(29)
2018–2020	LKS Czaniec	41	(17)
2020–2023	Beskid Andrychów	59	(24)
2023–	LKS Jawiszowice	73	(30)
- * Club domestic league appearances and goals as of 15:19, 27 June 2025 (UTC)

Kamil Karcz (born 19 August 1986) is a Polish footballer who plays as a midfielder for IV liga Lesser Poland club LKS Jawiszowice.

== Honours ==
LKS Czaniec

- IV liga Silesia II: 2018–19

Beskid Andrychów

- Polish Cup (Wadowice regionals): 2020–21

LKS Jawiszowice

- Polish Cup (Oświęcim regionals): 2024–25
