= Elina Johansson =

Swedish footballer (born 1986)

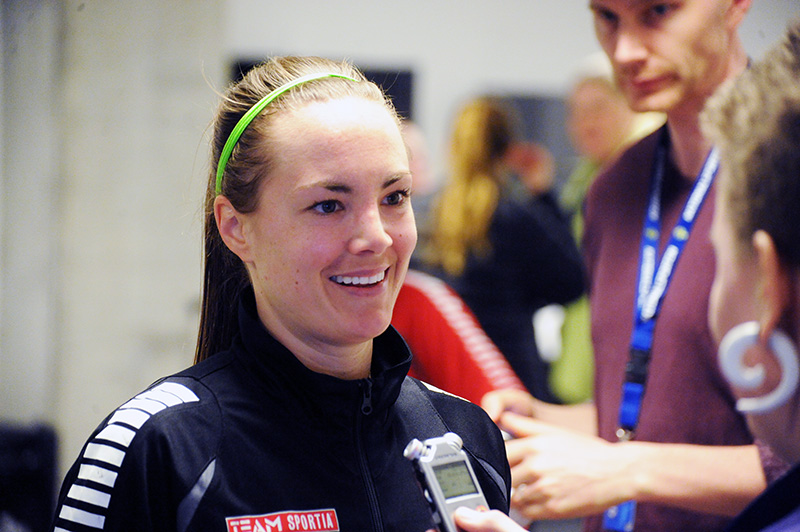

Personal information
- Full name: Elina Johansson
- Date of birth: 27 August 1986 (age 40)
- Place of birth: Sweden
- Position: Midfielder

Senior career*
Years	Team	Apps	(Gls)
2013	Eskilstuna United DFF	22	(7)
2014–2015	Hammarby IF DFF	38	(13)
2016	Eskilstuna United DFF	0	(0)
2017	IK Viljan		
2018–	Södersnäckornas BK	18	(8)
- * Club domestic league appearances and goals as of 02:43, 18 May 2016 (UTC)

Elina Johansson (born 27 August 1986) is a Swedish football midfielder.
