= Milena Vuković =

Serbian footballer (born 1986)

Personal information
- Full name: Milena Vuković
- Date of birth: 23 February 1986 (age 40)
- Place of birth: SFR Yugoslavia
- Position: Goalkeeper

Team information
- Current team: Žnk Osjek
- Number: 1

Senior career*
Years	Team	Apps	(Gls)
2003–2007	Pozarevac		
2007–2008	Sušica		
2008–2010	Šabac		
- Mašinac Niš (loan)
2010–2011	Napredak Kruševac		
2012	Požarevac		
2012–2014	BIIK Kazygurt		
2014–2015	SV Neulengbach		
2015–2016	Crvena Zvezda		
2016–2017	BIIK Kazygurt		
2017–2018	DVTK Hungaria		
2018–2018	Crvena Zvezda		
2018–2018	Mašinac Niš		
2019–	Žnk Osjek		

International career
- Serbia
- * Club domestic league appearances and goals

Milena Vuković (Serbian Cyrillic: Милена Вуковић; born 23 February 1986) is a Serbian football goalkeeper currently playing for BIIK Kazygurt in the Austrian Bundesliga at SV Neulengbach. She previously played for ŽFK Sušica, ŽFK Šabac, Mašinac Niš, Napredak Kruševac and ŽFK Požarevac in the Serbian First League. She has played the Champions League with Mašinac and BIIK, and she is a member of the Serbian national team.
