= Nicolás López (footballer, born 1986) =

Uruguayan footballer

Personal information
- Full name: Nicolás Fanque López Araujo
- Date of birth: 29 August 1986 (age 40)
- Place of birth: Montevideo, Uruguay
- Height: 1.90 m (6 ft 3 in)
- Position: Striker

Team information
- Current team: Huracán de Montevideo

Senior career*
Years	Team	Apps	(Gls)
2008–2009	Racing	10	(4)
2009	Manta	14	(5)
2010	Racing de Montevideo	6	(0)
2011	Manta	9	(0)
2011–2012	El Tanque Sisley	9	(2)
2012–	Huracán de Montevideo		
- * Club domestic league appearances and goals

Nicolás López Araújo (born 17 May 1986 in Montevideo) is a Uruguayan footballer currently playing the position of forward for Huracán Football Club in the Uruguayan Segunda División.
