= Kristina Stolpovskaya =

Kazakhstani footballer

Personal information
- Date of birth: 27 May 1986 (age 40)
- Position: Defender

Senior career*
Years	Team	Apps	(Gls)
- BIIK Kazygurt
- CSHVSM

International career^{‡}
	Kazakhstan U19	3	(0)
2004–2011	Kazakhstan	14+	(0+)
- * Club domestic league appearances and goals ‡ National team caps and goals as of 24 November 2011

Kristina Stolpovskaya (Kazakh: Кристина Столповская; born 27 May 1986) is a Kazakhstani former footballer who played as a defender. She has been a member of the Kazakhstan women's national team.
