= Arturo Carbonaro =

Italian footballer (born 1986)

Personal information
- Date of birth: 4 April 1986 (age 40)
- Place of birth: Salerno, Italy
- Position: Defender

Team information
- Current team: Chiavari Caperana

Senior career*
Years	Team	Apps	(Gls)
–2005	Salernitana	0	(0)
2005–2006	Savoia	31	(0)
2006–2008	Turris Neapolis	28	(0)
2008–2009	Scafatese	24	(1)
2009–2011	Cavese	7	(0)
2012	Battipagliese		
2012	Verbania		
2012–	Chiavari Caperana		
- * Club domestic league appearances and goals as of 02:03, 20 December 2010 (UTC)

Arturo Carbonaro (born 4 March 1986) is an Italian football defender who plays for Chiavari Caperana.
