= Jakub Rondzik =

Slovak footballer

Personal information
- Date of birth: 22 November 1986 (age 39)
- Place of birth: Košice, Czechoslovakia
- Height: 1.92 m (6 ft 4 in)
- Position: Goalkeeper

Senior career*
Years	Team	Apps	(Gls)
2004–2014	1. FK Příbram	4	(0)
2015–2017	FC Písek		

International career
- Slovakia U19
- * Club domestic league appearances and goals

Jakub Rondzik (born 22 November 1986) is a Slovak former footballer, who played as a goalkeeper in the Czech First League for 1. FK Příbram.

Rondzik signed a four-year contract with Czech side 1. FK Příbram in July 2004, having previously played for Austrian side SV Horn. One of four Slovak players at FK Příbram in the 2004–05 season, Rondzik was first included in a senior matchday squad in a 3–1 win against Sparta Prague, for which he was an unused substitute. After six years at the club, he made his senior debut for Příbram, keeping a clean sheet in a goalless draw against Baník Ostrava in July 2010. Later that season he made a substitute appearance against České Budějovice after the dismissal of first-choice goalkeeper Aleš Hruška in a 3–0 loss. He played the following match due to Hruska's suspension, although Příbram eventually lost to Jablonec 2–1.

In July 2015, Rondzik joined Bohemian Football League side FC Písek.

Outside of professional sport, Rondzik is also known as a musician. He released his debut single, under the moniker RNZ, in 2013.
