= Ismael Barragán =

Spanish footballer

Personal information
- Full name: Ismael Barragán Ruiz
- Date of birth: 6 February 1986 (age 40)
- Place of birth: Seville, Spain
- Height: 1.86 m (6 ft 1 in)
- Position: Central defender

Team information
- Current team: UD Pilas

Youth career
- Pilas
- 2004–2005: Sevilla

Senior career*
Years	Team	Apps	(Gls)
2005–2006	Sevilla C		
2005–2009	Sevilla B	64	(0)
2009–2010	Getafe B	35	(0)
2010–2011	Alcalá	33	(0)
2011–2012	Teruel	22	(0)
2012–2013	Kapfenberger SV	8	(0)
2013	Cacereño	0	(0)
2013–2014	Xerez	17	(1)
2014	Arandina	2	(0)
2014–2017	Extremadura	78	(3)
2017–2018	Ibiza	33	(0)
2018	Écija	14	(0)
2019–2021	Ibiza Islas Pitiusas	68	(3)
2021–2022	Recreativo de Huelva	29	(1)
2022–2023	Coria	24	(0)
2023–2025	Atlético Central	48	(2)
2025–	UD Pilas	2	(0)
- * Club domestic league appearances and goals as of 28 September 2025

Ismael Barragán Ruiz (born 6 February 1986) is a Spanish footballer who plays for eighth-tier Segunda Andaluza club UD Pilas as a central defender.
