= José Manuel Andoin =

Spanish sports shooter

Personal information
- Born: 29 April 1914 (age 112) Santoña, Spain
- Died: 29 April 1974

Sport
- Country: Spain
- Sport: Sports shooting

José Manuel Andoin (29 April 1914 – 1974) was a Spanish sports shooter. He competed at the 1948 Summer Olympics and 1960 Summer Olympics.
