= Robin Hofman =

Dutch footballer

Personal information
- Date of birth: 3 May 1986 (age 40)
- Place of birth: Rotterdam, Netherlands
- Height: 1.75 m (5 ft 9 in)
- Position: Attacking midfielder

Youth career
- RVV LMO
- Feyenoord

Senior career*
Years	Team	Apps	(Gls)
2005–2009	Excelsior	0	(0)
2008–2009	Excelsior U21		
2009–2016	Excelsior Maassluis	59	(2)
2016–2019	Zwaluwen		
2019–2020	XerxesDZB		
2020–2022	IJVV De Zwervers		
2022–2025	HOV/DJSCR		
- * Club domestic league appearances and goals as of 17 November 2024

Robin Hofman (born 3 May 1986) is a Dutch retired amateur footballer who played as a midfielder.

He joined Zwaluwen in 2016 after spending seven seasons at fellow amateur side Excelsior Maassluis. He later moved to XerxesDZB, IJVV De Zwervers and HOV/DJSCR.
