= Saad Al-Yami =

Saudi Arabian footballer

Personal information
- Full name: Saad Mubarak Al-Yami
- Date of birth: 11 August 1986 (age 40)
- Place of birth: Saudi Arabia
- Height: 1.88 m (6 ft 2 in)
- Position: Midfielder

Senior career*
Years	Team	Apps	(Gls)
2006–2010	Al Ittifaq		
2009	→ Najran SC (loan)		
2009–2010	→ Al-Raed FC (loan)	6	(0)
2012–2013	Hajer	34	(3)
2013	Al-Faisly	2	(0)
2013–2014	Al-Taawoun FC	10	(0)
2015–2016	Al-Nahda		
2016–2017	Al-Ansar		
2017–2020	Al-Jubail		
- * Club domestic league appearances and goals

Saad Al-Yami is a Saudi Arabian football who plays as a midfielder .
