= Sakatar Singh =

Indian footballer

Personal information
- Full name: Sakatar Singh
- Date of birth: 4 May 1986 (age 40)
- Place of birth: Jagatpur, Punjab, India
- Height: 1.74 m (5 ft 8 1/2 in)
- Position: Midfielder

Team information
- Current team: Mohun Bagan
- Number: 17

Senior career*
Years	Team	Apps	(Gls)
2005–2011	JCT		
2011–present	Mohun Bagan	37	(6)
- * Club domestic league appearances and goals

Sakatar Singh (born 1986) is an Indian football player. He is currently playing for Mohun Bagan AC in the I-League as a midfielder.
