= Nacho Neira =

Spanish footballer

Personal information
- Full name: Ignacio Neira Pedraja
- Date of birth: 16 November 1986 (age 39)
- Place of birth: Santoña, Spain
- Height: 1.88 m (6 ft 2 in)
- Position: Centre back

Youth career
- Noja
- 2003–2005: Laredo

Senior career*
Years	Team	Apps	(Gls)
2005–2007	Santoña		
2007–2008	Gimnástica	30	(3)
2008–2009	Racing B	18	(0)
2009–2013	Gimnástica	89	(0)
2013	AEL Kalloni	1	(0)
2013–2014	Barakaldo	25	(2)
2014–2015	Cartagena	14	(0)
2015–2016	Sestao	21	(1)
2016–2019	Portugalete		
- * Club domestic league appearances and goals

Ignacio 'Nacho' Neira Pedraja (born 16 November 1986) is a Spanish former footballer who played as a central defender.

== Club career ==
Born in Santoña, Cantabria, Neira graduated from local CD Laredo's youth system, but made his senior debuts with Santoña CF in the 2005–06 season, in the Tercera División. He first arrived in the Segunda División B in 2008 with Racing de Santander B, after a brief stint at Gimnástica de Torrelavega.

In July 2009 Neira returned to Gimnástica, now in the third tier. On 31 January 2013, after featuring regularly for the club over the course of three-and-a-half seasons, he moved abroad for the first time in his career, joining Greek Football League side AEL Kalloni

Neira played his first match as a professional on 22 May 2013, starting in a 3–0 away win against Anagennisi Giannitsa F.C., in which was his maiden appearance in the competition. On 21 June he returned to his home country, signing for third-tier Barakaldo CF; he subsequently resumed his career in the same division, representing FC Cartagena and Sestao River.
