= Igor Sani =

Guinea-Bissauan footballer

Personal information
- Full name: Igor Fábio Mascarenhas Sani
- Date of birth: 28 December 1986 (age 39)
- Place of birth: Lisbon, Portugal
- Height: 1.75 m (5 ft 9 in)
- Position: Centre forward

Team information
- Current team: Vialonga

Senior career*
Years	Team	Apps	(Gls)
2005–2006	Odivelas B		
2006–2007	Loures		
2007–2009	Igreja Nova		
2009–2011	Torreense	46	(14)
2011–2012	Farense	27	(18)
2012–2013	Fátima	7	(2)
2013–2014	Frauenfeld	8	(3)
2014–2015	Loures	24	(4)
2016–2018	Vila Franca do Rosário	35	(14)
2018–2022	AC Malveira	73	(20)
2022–2023	Vila Franca do Rosário	29	(25)
2023–2024	AC Malveira	12	(3)
2024–	Vialonga		

International career^{‡}
2014	Guinea-Bissau	2	(0)
- * Club domestic league appearances and goals as of 18:08, 14 July 2015 (UTC) ‡ National team caps and goals as of 18:08, 14 July 2015 (UTC)

Igor Fábio Mascarenhas Sani (born 28 December 1986) is a footballer who plays for Portuguese team Vialonga, as a centre forward. Born in Portugal, he played for Guinea-Bissau at international level.

== Career ==
Born in Lisbon, Sani has played club football in Portugal and Switzerland for Odivelas B, Loures, Igreja Nova, Torreense, Farense, Fátima, Frauenfeld, Vila Franca do Rosário, AC Malveira, and Vialonga.

He made his senior international debut for Guinea-Bissau in 2014, earning two caps.
