= Ahmed Rahmatullah =

Qatari footballer (born 1986)

Personal information
- Full name: Ahmed Rahmatullah Lutfi
- Date of birth: 22 July 1986 (age 40)
- Place of birth: Qatar
- Height: 1.80 m (5 ft 11 in)
- Position: Defender

Senior career*
Years	Team	Apps	(Gls)
2004–2009	Al-Ahli		
2009–2012	Umm Salal		
2012–2018	Al-Wakra		
- * Club domestic league appearances and goals

Ahmed Rahmatullah (Arabic: أحمد رحمة الله; born 22 July 1986) is a Qatari footballer.
