= Henri Martin (French politician) =

French political activist (1927–2015)

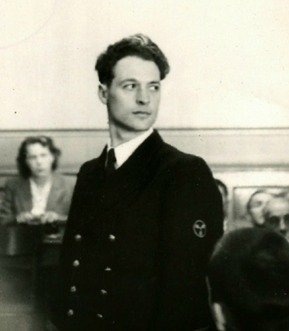
Henri Martin

Henri Ursin Clément Martin (French pronunciation: [ɑ̃ʁi maʁtɛ̃]; 23 January 1927 – 17 February 2015) was a political activist of the French Communist Party and former sailor famous for the political-military scandal called the Henri Martin affair, in which the government of the French Fourth Republic meted out a five-year prison sentence to him for distributing pamphlets in opposition to the First Indochina War. He was born in Lunery, Cher and died in Pantin.

== Early life ==
=== Family ===
Henri Martin was born Henri Ursin Clement Martin on January 23, 1927, in Rosieres, an industrial part of Lunery a commune in the Loire region in central France. His father worked as a balance-adjuster but later in life became municipal council and deputy mayor of his region. Martin's mother was a pious woman who made sure her children had a religious education from which Martin became an altar boy within the Catholic Church at the age of five. Martin was recorded as being a studious, straight-arrow, shy child who suffered from asthma. His asthma was severe enough that he had a delicate childhood where he was surrounded by constant care as his family was in fear of the results of his violent asthma attacks. Martin said of his padded childhood, “Je n’avais rien d’un dur” which translates to “I had nothing hard”.

=== Origins in radical politics ===
With such a sheltered childhood, Martin spent most of his hours at the house of his elderly neighbor who had served in the ranks of the Communist Party during the Congress of Tours. The old woman recounted her life to Martin including her political battles and the steps taken by the labor movement. It's recorded that Martin enjoyed her company and absorbed everything that she told him about the world. She taught him what she referred to as “sa propre histoire” which really meant the history of his class. Martin learned quickly that he was the son of a laborer and was himself a future laborer. From his early years, Martin was familiar with the language and dialectics of the Communist Party. To Martin, Communism wasn't a new political movement but an ancient one as he had learned of it from someone he viewed as ancient herself. In that perspective, Martin didn't see the politics as truly radical but as time-tested and true. From that old woman's mouth, Martin learned the mythic, holy, and true history of the proletariat. It was at this point that his upbringing in the Church overlapped with that of his informal Communist education. The language of the church assured Martin that he was a child of God but the language of Communism gave him an equally impressive lineage as a royal child of the Third Republic, a citizen, who was at birth destined to serve a cause.

== Military ==
As a natural progression from his informal education in radical politics, Martin joined the French Communist Party early on and prioritized the cause. During World War II, Martin entered the French Resistance to liberate France from the Nazis within the ranks of Francs-Tireurs et Partisans (FTP) who were generally oriented around communism. In the realm of left-wing, communist movements, there sometimes rises up a cause that is evil enough to assuage and bridge the bourgeoisie-proletariat relationship. For France, this evil cause that initiated momentary reconciliation was the Nazis. The French were victims of foreign occupation by the Germans leading to the natural rise in anticolonial sentiments. This feeling of momentary pause to the bourgeoisie-proletariat struggle along with convictions against authoritarian foreign powers persuaded young Martin to sign up with the French Navy in 1945 on a five-year contract to fight against the imperial Japanese in the Pacific Theatre during WWII.

And yet, 1945 was a seminal year for Japan as 2 September 1945 witnessed the formal surrender of Imperial Japan. And so, this young soldier had signed away five years of his life to a cause that ended shortly after signing. Instead of Imperial Japan, young Martin was sent to Indochina to participate in military operations and battles against native uprisings and more specifically the Democratic Republic of Vietnam (DRV), the newly inaugurated communist-led party in North Vietnam. It was during Martin's deployment in November 1946 that he witnessed the violent Haiphong Incident colloquially dubbed the “Haiphong massacres”. This was the last straw for young Martin and many other soldiers. Martin was not alone in his distaste for the war in Indochina. The French had experienced personally the effects of colonial conflict and so many soldiers saw their actions in the French military in Indochina as either active or passive involvement in the colonization of a foreign peoples. French statesman Maurice Viollette summarizes the appeal for the war in Indochina by comparing it to that of "Dying for Danzig" during WWII – that is to say, it was not highly popular.

Thoroughly appalled by what he deemed a war of oppression, Martin requested repatriation and was denied multiple times until 1947 after which he quickly returned to France, still a member of the French military. Soon after, in May 1949, when the PCF had been kicked out of the French government in an official capacity, they began their boisterous campaign slogan, “Not one more man not one more penny for the war in Indochina.” Attracted to their strong anticolonial stance, Martin took up stronger support to the PCF and began secretly campaigning himself among his military peers against the colonial presence in Indochina.

== The Henri Martin affair ==
=== Contemporary context ===
Henri Martin was born a citizen of the Third Republic but by the time of the Indochina War and his celebrity-making incident, Martin was a military member and citizen of the Fourth Republic. The republic was struggling ideologically under leadership that were, by precedent, either pro-Germany or followed Petain in nationalism and conservatism. De Gaulle had departed, there was serious public fear of Soviet invasion, unrest in the colonies and tedious international diplomacy. The period of 1945-1954 was a period particularly unstable and divisive in French history. The political divide in France, at this time, was largely due to the Indochina War, the topic which was the cause for the ousting of the French Communist Party (PCF; Parti communiste français) out of any official capacity of governance. The PCF was not a fringe party but highly supported especially during the postwar period. Without an official seat in government, the PCF increased their protest launching their banner in May 1949, “Not one more man, not one more penny for the war in Indochina”. Even with a fairly disengaged public there was a significant population willing to commit seriously to protesting the Indochina War. All of the “sale guerre” or “dirty war” talk instigated plenty of citizenry action from handing out tracts and antiwar articles to even dock workers who refused to load military equipment headed for the war effort. These dock worker strikes started in late 1949 and continued into 1950 with a high concentration among the dockers of the port of Marseilles. It was the strikes that made the government nervous in recognizing the possible military and national security threat of the refusal. In March 1950 the government passed a law against “acts of sabotage against army equipment, those who obstruct free movement of military equipment, and those who undertake the demoralization of the army.” With this law enacted, the government had outlined authority to target and arrest an increasing number of protestors.

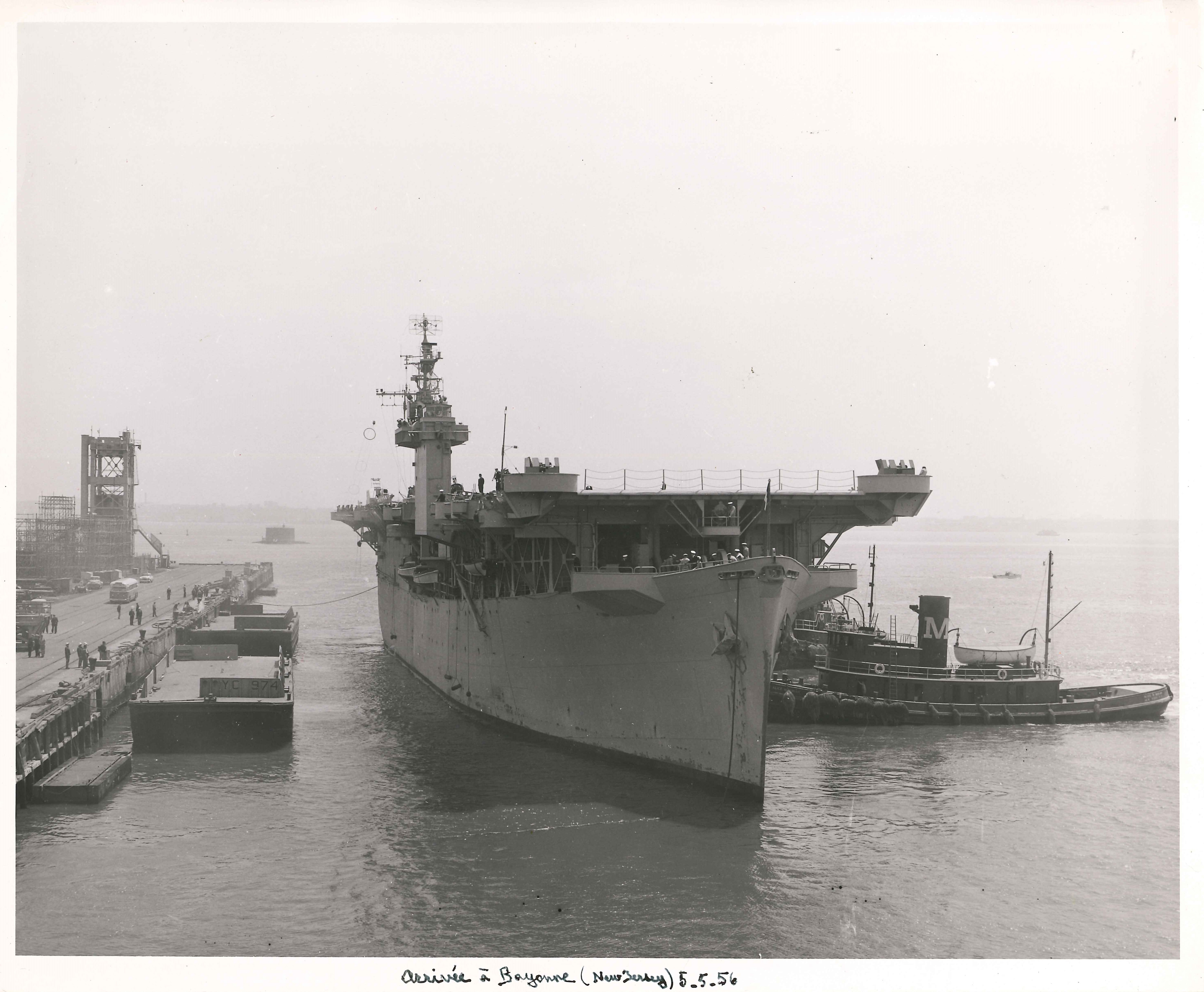
Dixmude aircraft carrier that Henri Martin was accused of attempting to sabotage

=== The incident ===
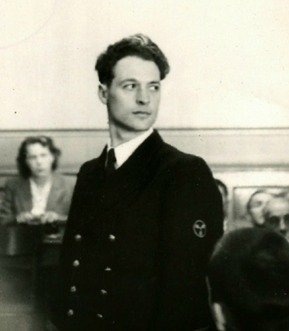
Photograph taken of Henri Martin in uniform during his trial October 1950

Martin returned stateside, as requested, in July 1949 to be stationed at the naval dockyard in Toulon. He continued his efforts against what he called the imperial venture in the Indochina war in inciting his fellow soldiers on base, handing out pamphlets, and even targeted new recruits to turn their opinion against the military's efforts in the Indochina War. With the new law in effect in 1950, Martin was among some of the firsts arrests in March 1950, including the equally notorious Raymonde Dien; all were taken in for demoralizing efforts against the military and the government of France. As it follows, Martin was arrested by the military authorities and held until his hearing by a military tribunal in Toulon in October 1950 under the charges of distribution of anti war pamphlets and the attempted sabotage of the Dixmude aircraft carrier. His charge for the sabotage of the Dixmude was shared with 20-year-old Charles Heimburger as they were second master mechanics that could have had access to the ship to throw a handful of emery stone in the oil bath of the propeller shaft of Dixmude. The morning of his trial, there were people everywhere around the courthouse. People were coming in on buses, people were standing on chairs giving impromptu speeches, the city was covered in graffiti and posters, even an effigy of Martin himself. Walkouts were happening at workshops all over the city, car parades, rallies and open air meetings, all for the purpose of political awareness and freeing Henri Martin. At 9 am that morning, a 24-year-old Martin arrived, surrounded by gendarmes, dressed in his dark sailor's uniform, and was described as wearing a young and moreover friendly face. When he entered the courtroom, though it was packed with lawyers, journalists, and witnesses, there was an immediate and impressive silence. Martin's father, who had come in from Cher, sat on the front row bench with Martin's sister and fiancé (there was also the noticeable presence of Communist activists.) Even with the clear lack of evidence and Martin vehemently denying the latter accusation of the Dixmude, though admitting to the former, Martin was sentenced to five years in prison and dishonorably discharged from the French Navy. The judgement was ultimately quashed but Martin appeared again in July 1951 before the Brest maritime tribunal, which pronounced the same sentence against him.

=== Public reaction ===
The French public had not been readily interested in discussions surrounding anti-imperialism and the war in Indochina until they had Henri Martin as a national symbol of the struggle against imperialism. Martin quickly became a celebrity and a popular cause for antiwar protesters and left leaning intellectuals. The trial and the support of cultural icons, intellectual forerunners, and the PCF together publicized the "mains sales" or the dirty hands narrative of the Indochina War which indicted France as oppressor and colonizer. The public rallied behind Martin in reaction and in parallel to the public contributions of artists, intellectuals, and communist party spokesmen. There were street parades, graffiti, signage, petitions, balloons plastered with Martin's name, streets renamed, and leaflets handed out for months after Martin's arrest all with the same messages: "Liberez Henri Martin" and "Paix au Vietnam". The French public which had previously been so disinterested was now fully mobilized for the cause of Henri Martin and against France's imperialistic efforts in Vietnam.

==== The Communist Party ====
The Communist Party had long been on the outside of the French government and so their avenue for political impact was the rally for public causes that hindered the war effort since they were unable to do so with proper legislation. Henri Martin was seen as the perfect man to strengthen the party's image and anti-imperialist stance. 1951 was when the PCF began to campaign for the release of Henri Martin. They created series of leaflets and held public discussions to raise awareness primarily for Martin's release but secondarily for party's concerns on France's relationship with the United States and France's colonial efforts in the pacific. The party was always very present throughout the Henri Martin Affair and even at his trial, the local party officials from the Var region of France were present within the courtroom. The young and attractive sailor whom they painted as a "grand patriote" was the ideal symbol to attract younger and broader French support of the party.

==== Intellectuals ====
Within the PCF, there were many intellectuals and well-known philosophers who published material in the form of essays, pamphlets, leaflets, and compilations to show their support of Henri Martin. Martin provided a hero to the left that could stand against those heroes on the pollical right like Marcel Bigeard and Genevieve de Galard. With that hero-status, Martin attracted deeply politicized rhetoric towards his cause especially from the intellectual elites.

A central figure of Martin's intellectual supporters was Jean-Paul Sartre. A French philosopher who was previously ostracized by the PCF for his humanist and existential additions to Marxism now found his place back within the fold of the PCF because of his ready contribution to the Martin effort. Sartre lead the publication of a compilation of essays by various French intellectuals such as Leiris, Vercors, Francis Jeanson, and Jean-Marie Domenach. The compilation was titled L'affaire Henri Martin and was published in late 1953. Sartre's primary defense of Martin was legal instead of political. Sartre's language reached back into the language of the Dreyfus Affair in a call to defend universal justice. Sartre notably stated, “Right now we must choose. Either we publicly denounce the arbitrary or we make ourselves complicitous in it. Because it is in our name that Martin is kept in prison and that this guilty Justice claims to be our Justice.” Sartre also commented on Martin's struggle as the fundamental struggle of the proletariat. Sartre sets the Martin case up as a bulwark of class struggle that forces the public to choose a side. He paints Martin as a resistance fighter against the common Nazi enemy to the bourgeoisie and the proletariat only to then set the French bourgeoisie as the oppressor in the war in Indo-China. In this manner, Sartre is using Martin as a political pawn to humanize France's current international relations to sway the French public into sympathy for Martin which parallels into sympathy for the proletariat and agitation against the bourgeoise.

Another important intellectual contribution to Henri Martin's defense was from André Marty, a French politician and high-ranking member of the PCF. Marty created a support committee and was involved with the mobilization of many of the protesting elements along with publishing pamphlets. Marty was also instrumental in publishing a small booklet titled "Pour la liberation d’Henri Martin" by the Société Nationale des Entreprises de Guerre that outlined Martin's defense and his place within the French canon as patriot.

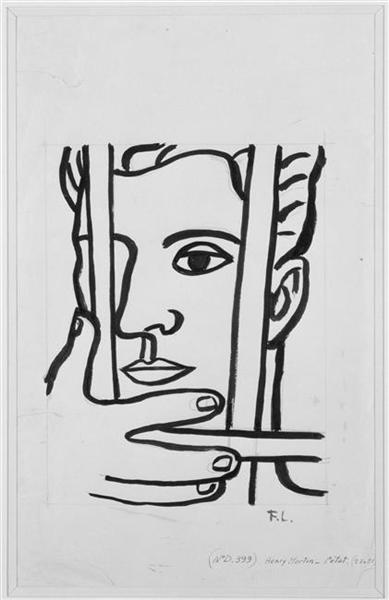
The portrait done by Leger in gauche and graphite

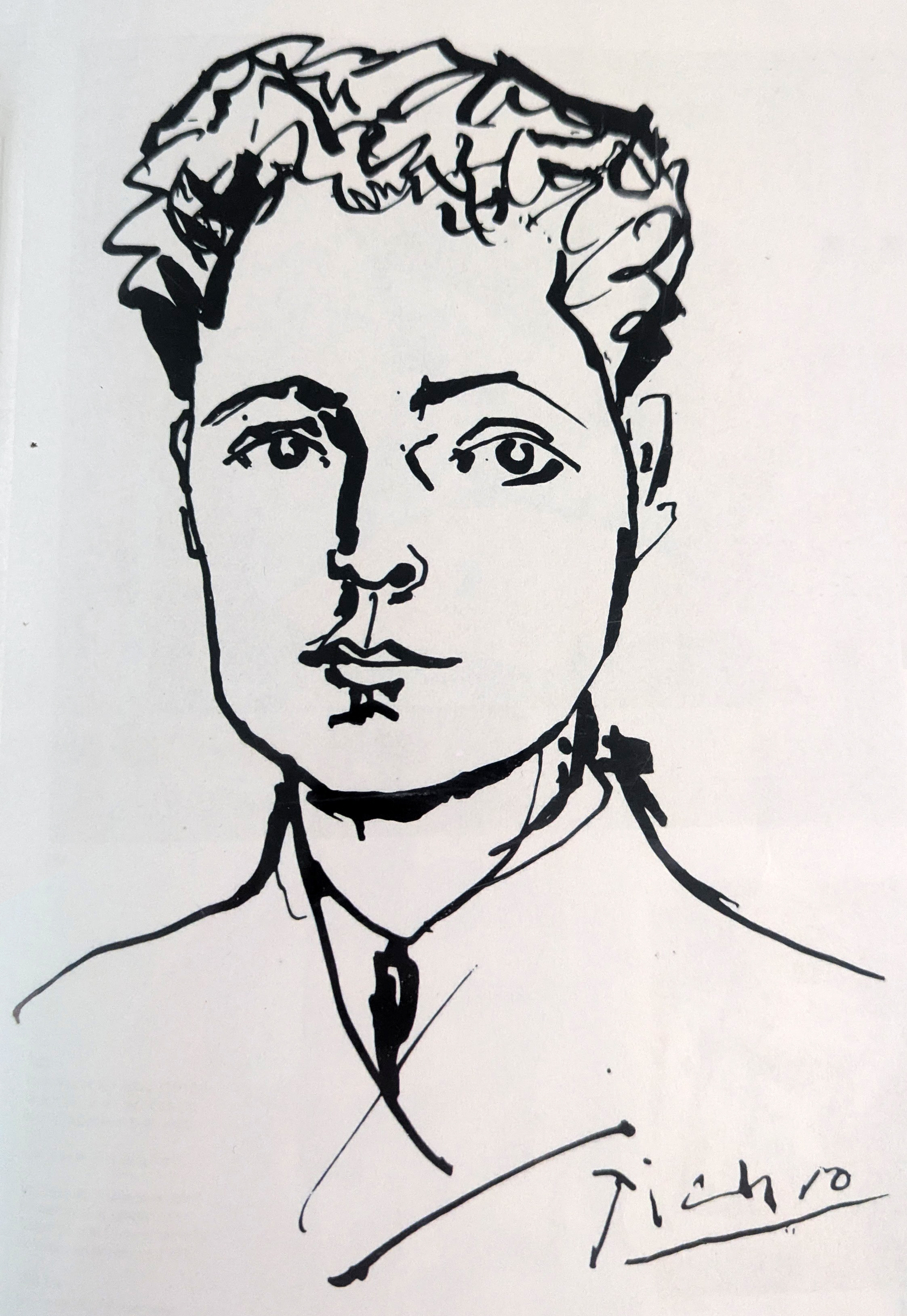
The portrait done by Pablo Picasso

==== The culture ====
Outside of pamphlets, booklets, and essays, Martin's face and cause was prevalent within the cultural community in France. Regards, a popular communist magazine published in Paris, ran two separate editions of their magazine in support of Martin. The first special issue was titled, "Henri Martin, marin de France" (translated: Henri Martin, French Sailor) and was published 20 October 1950. The second Regards special issue was a follow up and titled "Henri Martin, marin de la liberte" (translated: Henri Martin, Sailor of Liberty) and was published 22 February then republished in the La Defense special issue July 1952. Along with magazines, songs and poems were written about Martin or dedicated to him. Jacques Prévert, French poet, dedicated his poem Entendez-vous, gens du Vietnam in honor of Martin. French poet, Raymond Lavigne published an entire book in 1951 about Martin composed into twelve poems titled Poèmes pour Henri Martin. French composer Serge Nigg wrote Cantate pour Henri Martin in Martin's honor as well.

Another well-known way that French culture interreacted with Martin during his trial was through comedies and plays performed in public squares. The most central play was written by Claude Martin and Henri Delmas called Drame à Toulon which outlined all the events in Martin's life surrounding his arrest, trial, and imprisonment. It has been estimated that this particular play was performed around 300 times to an audience of 100,000 people.

Prominent artists also took an active interest in Martin and his situation. André Fougeron made a sketch of Martin in his prison uniform; Fernand Léger made a pencil and gauche painting of Martin titled "Portrait of Henri Martin" that is currently held in the collections of the Fernand-Léger National Museum in Biot; and Pablo Picasso made an ink portrait of Martin that was featured in a special issue of the magazine L'Humanité published 2 August 1953.

=== Denouement ===
Martin was arrested March 1950, on trial October 1950, and was given wide support from the French public up until his unexpected early release August 1953. Martin was imprisoned for 3 1/2 years out of his 5-year sentencing. During that time he lost 10 kg due to the harsh conditions of the maritime jail in which he was held for 15 months before being transferred to a more humane prison in Melun. When in the Melun prison, Martin had access to books and magazines and was allowed to marry his fiancé Simone Le Balbe 30 November 1951. Even though they were allowed to marry, they were given only 10 minutes together, supervised by prison guards, as a married couple. 2 August 1952, Vincent Auriol, then president of France, issued Martin's unexpected release quietly. There is film recorded by the French Ministry of Culture of Martin's release and reacceptance into French society where Martin is seen alongside his new wife. The pardon from the president came as the public was becoming increasing agitated and vocal about France's colonial efforts. Under Auriol's presidency, France's participation in imperial pursuits waned and Henri Martin's discreet release was one act of many that Auriol made to ease the growing political tensions.

== Political life after 1953 ==
Shortly after his release, Martin helped to produce and acted in a documentary that outlined his experience featuring poems that were written about him, reenactments of the court proceedings, and video recordings of the street protests and civic efforts to free Martin. The documentary was titled D'autres sont seuls au monde (translated: Others are alone in the world) and is available through the PCF film archives.

Martin was especially vocal about the rising left-wing political movement in France in the months after his release. Martin's celebrity was international and was used to further the causes of the PCF. Martin wrote editorials and commentary on French politics in many international political journals but most notably in a long review in an Australian journal titled Australian Left Review in which Martin's article was titled Towards a Left Coalition.

Martin continued his public relationship with the PCF and his public fight against the Vietnam War. In the summer of 1954, Martin became a leader of the Union of Republican Youth of France (UJRF) or more commonly known as the Mouvement Jeunes communistes de France (MJCF). He was elected national secretary in 1955 then deputy general secretary in 1956. He remained with the MJCF until 1962. During the sixties and early seventies, Martin was involved with the Federation of Seine North-East where he served as secretary then head. From 1967-1979 Martin served as head of the education section of the central committee developing programs and brochures for the schools. From there, Martin became director of the Central School of the PCF. During the 1980s, Martin participated more directly with the PCF and legislative agendas that took a critical position towards the French government. From 1990 until his death 17 February 2015, Martin was active with the problems of French veterans.

== Personal life after 1953 ==
Martin married Le Balbe, a municipal employee of Aubervilliers, in 1951 while he was imprisoned. Together they had three children after Martin was released. Annick was born in 1954, Jean-Louis was born in 1955 and Jean-Jacques was born in 1957. Martin and Le Balbe were divorced in 1985. Martin remarried Arlette Boilot 6 October 1986.

== See also ==
- First Indochina War
- Henri Martin affair
