= Fram, Paraguay =

Fram
- City & District
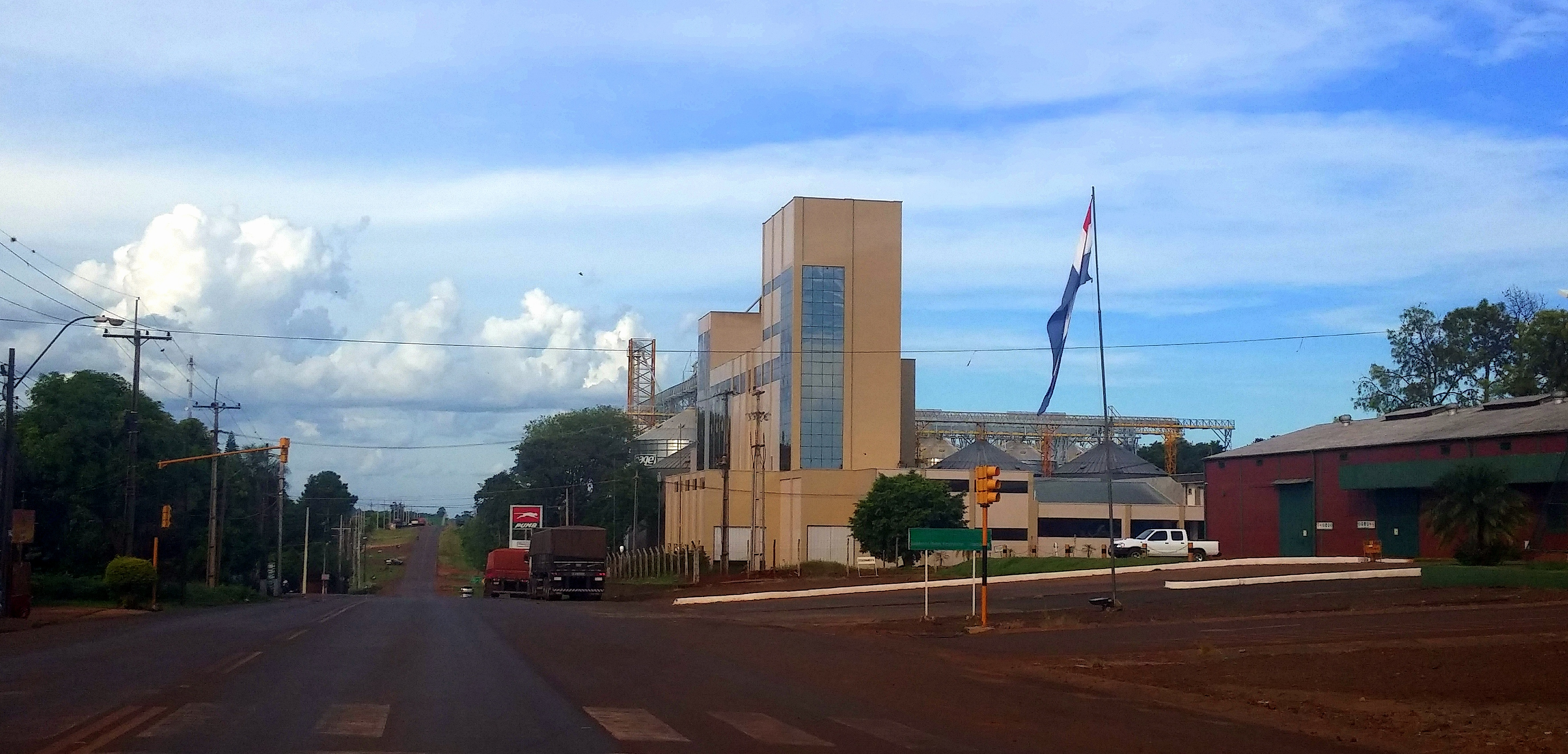
- Fram, Paraguay

- Location within Paraguay
- Coordinates: 27°06′00″S 56°00′36″W
- Country: Paraguay
- Department: Itapúa Department
- Founded: March 20, 1927

Government
  - Intendant: Ireneu Engelmann (PEN)
- Elevation: 195 m (640 ft)

Population (2002)
  - Total: 6,923
- Time zone: UTC-04 (AST)
  - Summer (DST): UTC-03 (ADT)
- Area code: 0516

Fram (or Colonia Fram) is a city & one of the 30 districts in the Itapúa Department of Paraguay.

== History ==
Fram was founded on March 20, 1927, by Norwegian Pedro Cristophensen, along with Mateo Sanchez, a native of Carmen del Paraná. The old name of the place was Apereá.
The residents of Fram are of Slavic origin (Poles, Russians and Ukrainians), German and Japanese.

== Toponymy ==
Fram is a Norwegian word meaning "Forward" and is the name of the famous ship that brought the Norwegian explorer Fridtjof Nansen and his crew to the Arctic ice in 1893.
Fram also is known as "The Capital of Wheat", a nickname earned by being an area of wheat production, since its founding.

== Demography ==
According to the Dirección General de Estadísticas, Encuestas y Censos the district has a total population of 6,923 inhabitants, of which 3.414 live in its urban area.

== Location ==
The city of Fram is situated 46 km north-west of the Encarnación, 22 km north-east of Carmen del Paraná.
You can get there taking Route Number 1 (taking a detour in Coronel Bogado) or Route Number 6 (taking a detour in Capitán Miranda).

== Economy ==
The district have experienced significant progress in recent years due to the participation of its citizens in solving community problems. It highlights in particular their social insurance system of the municipality that provides health coverage to all its inhabitants.
The district of Fram has become a center of national development, an example of community development and self-management. There is also a harmony between the people and the business community.
Its main economic items are farming, agribusiness, livestock, pigs and poultry. A beautiful Orthodox church completes the landscape of this progressive city.

== See also ==
- Immigration to Paraguay
