= Lewis Hamilton (footballer) =

English footballer (born 1984)

Personal information
- Date of birth: 21 November 1984 (age 41)
- Place of birth: Derby, England
- Height: 1.69 m (5 ft 7 in)
- Position: Defender

Team information
- Current team: Horsham

Youth career
- 2004: Derby County

Senior career*
Years	Team	Apps	(Gls)
2004–2005	Queens Park Rangers	1	(0)
2005–2006	Aldershot Town	30	(0)
2006–2008	Lewes	39	(1)
2008–2009	Tonbridge Angels	58	(1)
2010–2013	Lewes	133	(0)
2013–	Horsham	45	(1)
- * Club domestic league appearances and goals as of 23:51, 15 June 2011 (UTC)

Lewis Emmanuel Hamilton (born 21 November 1984) is an English footballer who plays as a defender for Horsham.

== Career ==
Hamilton made his Football League debut for Queens Park Rangers in the Championship after coming on as a substitute against Burnley at Turf Moor on 19 April 2005.

He then moved to Aldershot Town, and then Lewes, where he was part of the 2007–08 Conference South winning side. Hamilton signed for Tonbridge Angels in July 2008 after a successful trial. Hamilton left Tonbridge in December 2009 and subsequently rejoined Lewes.

Hamilton signed for Isthmian League side Horsham at the start of the 2013–14 campaign.

== Honours ==
Lewes

- Conference South: 2007–08
