= Oscar Centurión =

Paraguayan footballer (born 1986)

Personal information
- Date of birth: 24 January 1986 (age 40)
- Place of birth: Asunción, Paraguay
- Height: 1.86 m (6 ft 1 in)
- Position: Defender

Senior career*
Years	Team	Apps	(Gls)
2004–2006	Olimpia		
2006–2009	Sol de América	16	(0)
2009	→ San José (loan)	3	(0)
2009–2010	Sol de América	8	(0)
2011	Deportes Copiapó	11	(0)
2012	Sportivo San Lorenzo		
2013	El Porvenir	6	(0)
2015	Deportivo Quevedo	7	(0)
2016	Deportivo Santaní		
2017	Sport Colombia	–	(–)
- * Club domestic league appearances and goals

Oscar Javier Centurión (born 24 January 1986 in Asunción, Paraguay) is a Paraguayan former footballer who played as a centre-back.

== Teams ==
- (Paraguay) Olimpia 2004–2006
- (Paraguay) Sol de América 2006–2008
- (Bolivia) San José 2009
- (Paraguay) Sol de América 2009–2010
- (Chile) Deportes Copiapó 2011
- (Paraguay) Sportivo San Lorenzo 2012
- (Argentina) El Porvenir 2013
- (Ecuador) Deportivo Quevedo 2015
- (Paraguay) Deportivo Santaní 2016
- (Paraguay) Sport Colombia 2017

== Honours ==
Sol de América

- Paraguayan División Intermedia: 2006
