= Bawa Mumuni =

Ghanaian footballer (born 1986)

Personal information
- Full name: Bawa Mumuni
- Date of birth: 13 October 1986 (age 40)
- Place of birth: Ghana
- Height: 5 ft 10 in (1.78 m)
- Position: Defender

Youth career
- Fauzan F.C.

Senior career*
Years	Team	Apps	(Gls)
2001–2003	Fauzan F.C.		
2004–2009	Liberty Professionals		
2008	→ Bendel Insurance (loan)		
2009–2010	Hearts of Oak		
2010	Nam Dinh		
- * Club domestic league appearances and goals

Bawa Mumuni (born 13 October 1986) is a Ghanaian football player who last played for Vietnamese Second Division club Nam Dinh. He is a central defender.

== Career ==
He began his football career in 2001 with Fauzan F.C. before he moved to Liberty Professionals FC. Where he was made the captain of the team. In December 2008 Mumuni left his club Liberty Professionals FC on loan to Bendel Insurance F.C., after his return in October 2009 he signed for Accra Hearts of Oak SC. The 2008 league champions and the most successful club in Ghanaian top league on 7 October 2009 he signed a new contract with them. Best defender Ghana Premier League 2007/2008. Most disciplined player 2008/2009 League season.
