= Mikhail Malykhin =

Russian footballer

Personal information
- Full name: Mikhail Anatolyevich Malykhin
- Date of birth: 25 February 1986 (age 40)
- Height: 1.95 m (6 ft 5 in)
- Position: Defender

Youth career
- FC Dynamo Moscow

Senior career*
| Years | Team | Apps | (Gls) |
| 2004–2006 | FC Dynamo Moscow | 0 | (0) |
| 2007 | FC Metallurg-Kuzbass Novokuznetsk | 12 | (0) |
| 2008 | FC MVD Rossii Moscow | 0 | (0) |
| 2008–2009 | FC Zelenograd | 37 | (2) |
| 2010 | FC Istra | 14 | (0) |
| 2012–2013 | FC Olimp Fryazino | | |
- * Club domestic league appearances and goals

Mikhail Anatolyevich Malykhin (Russian: Михаил Анатольевич Малыхин; born 25 February 1986) is a former Russian professional football player.

== Club career ==
He played in the Russian Football National League for FC Metallurg-Kuzbass Novokuznetsk in 2007.
