= Scott Mulholland =

English footballer

Personal information
- Full name: Scott Rene Mulholland
- Date of birth: 7 September 1986 (age 40)
- Place of birth: Bexleyheath, England
- Position: Forward

Youth career
- Woolwich Youth
- –2004: Queens Park Rangers

Senior career*
| Years | Team | Apps | (Gls) |
| 2004–2005 | Queens Park Rangers | 1 | (0) |
| 2004 | → Hastings United (loan) | | |
| 2006–201? | Thamesmead Town | | |
| Total | | 1 | (0) |
- * Club domestic league appearances and goals

Scott Rene Mulholland (born 7 September 1986) is an English professional footballer, who played for Queens Park Rangers between 2004 and 2005.

== Career ==
Mulholland joined Woolwich Youth FC of the Bexley league at the age of eight, at the time managed by his father. A year later, aged nine, Mullholland was accepted into the youth section of Queens Park Rangers (QPR), turning down a chance to play with Ajax. Mulholland continued at Woolwich Youth as a centre forward, scoring 211 goals in 5 years. During this period he also represented Bexley Borough and Kent county football sides.

Mulholland was invited by manager Ian Holloway to train with the QPR first team in 2004. After training with the team for several months and playing understudy to Canadian midfielder Marc Bircham, Mulholland was loaned out in February 2004 to Hastings United in the Isthmian League in a three-month deal, before being recalled after two weeks by QPR due to an injury crisis.

He made his first team appearance on 19 April 2005 when he came off the bench to replace Marc Bircham after 69 minutes of the game against Burnley.

Mulholland joined Thamesmead Town in summer 2006, and won the Kent League with them in the 2007–08 season. He remained there until at least 2011.
