= Aron Liechti =

Swiss footballer (born 1986)

Personal information
- Date of birth: 15 February 1986 (age 40)
- Place of birth: Switzerland
- Height: 1.89 m (6 ft 2 in)
- Position: Fullback

Team information
- Current team: FC Biel-Bienne
- Number: 6

Youth career
- 1996–1999: FC Aarberg
- 1999–2007: BSC Young Boys

Senior career*
Years	Team	Apps	(Gls)
2007–2011	BSC Young Boys	18	(0)
2008–2009	→ FC Biel-Bienne (loan)	21	(1)
2010–2011	→ FC Biel-Bienne (loan)	27	(1)
2011–	FC Biel-Bienne		

International career^{‡}
2008	Switzerland U-21	1	(0)
- * Club domestic league appearances and goals as of 6 February 2010 ‡ National team caps and goals as of 20 May 2008

Aron Liechti (born 15 February 1986) is a Swiss football defender, who currently plays for FC Biel-Bienne.
