= Vusi Mthimkhulu =

South African soccer player

Personal information
- Full name: Vusi Simon Mthimkhulu
- Date of birth: 23 January 1986 (age 40)
- Position: Defender

Senior career*
Years	Team	Apps	(Gls)
2006–2007	Island FC		
2007–2009	Thanda Royal Zulu		
2009–2011	Witbank Spurs		
2011–2014	Orlando Pirates		
2012–2013	→ Thanda Royal Zulu (loan)	18	(0)
2013–2014	→ Polokwane City (loan)	16	(0)
2014–2015	→ Witbank Spurs (loan)	19	(0)
2015–?	Polokwane City	0	(0)
- * Club domestic league appearances and goals

Vusi Simon Mthimkhulu (born 23 January 1986) is a South African soccer player who played as a defender, among others for Polokwane City in the Premier Soccer League.

Mthimkhulu joined one of South Africas big three clubs, Orlando Pirates, but was loaned out to gain experience. The 2013–14 season was spent on loan at Polokwane City, where he made 18 league appearances. Instead of remaining in "Rise and Shine", he went on a new loan to Witbank Spurs, a club he had previously joined in 2009. Having never played for Orlado Pirates, the club decided to release him in 2015.

In the spring of 2019, Mthimkhulu started a coaching career as assistant to Themba Mafu at Witbank Spurs, after the club sacked Ephraim Mashaba. Witbank Spurs changed its name to BTM Sports later in 2019, with Mthimkhulu remaining coach. He later managed Voota FC.
