= Ndidi Kanu =

Nigerian footballer

- Born: 26 August 1986 (age 39); Abuja

Ndidi Kanu (born 26 August 1986) is a Nigerian footballer who played for Odense Q.

== Life ==
Kanu was born in Abuja in 1986. Kanu began paying with the FTC Queens before moving at the start of the season 2003/04 to Denmark. She moved from there to Odense BK in 2006 for six months. In the summer of 2006, she returned their Danish club OB for half a year, after a serious injury to the knee.

Kanu joined in August 2006 back on loan to Nigeria to Remo Queens and returned in February 2007 back to Odense BK.

== National ==
Kanu belongs since 2002 to the Nigeria women's national football team. In the summer of 2003, she was appointed to the 2003 FIFA Women's World Cup pre-selection of 35 players but she did not make the team that played due to an anterior cruciate ligament injury.
