= José Manuel (footballer, born 2003) =

Spanish footballer

Personal information
- Full name: José Manuel Nicolás Ayén
- Date of birth: 22 September 2003 (age 23)
- Place of birth: Murcia, Spain
- Height: 1.77 m (5 ft 10 in)
- Position: Midfielder

Team information
- Current team: Unión Molinense

Youth career
- Beniaján
- 2021: Cartagena

Senior career*
Years	Team	Apps	(Gls)
2021–2023	Cartagena B	2	(0)
2021–2023	Cartagena	1	(0)
2022–2023	→ Alcantarilla (loan)	25	(0)
2023–2024	Racing Murcia	31	(1)
2024–2025	Águilas B	31	(0)
2025–	Unión Molinense	10	(0)
- * Club domestic league appearances and goals as of 9 November 2025

José Manuel Nicolás Ayén (born 22 September 2003), known as José Manuel, is a Spanish professional footballer who plays as a central midfielder for Tercera Federación club Unión Molinense.

== Club career ==
Born in Murcia, José Manuel played for Beniaján UCAM CF before signing a contract with FC Cartagena on 21 June 2021; he was initially assigned to the Juvenil squad. He made his senior debut with the reserves on 31 October, coming on as a second-half substitute in a 1–1 Tercera División RFEF away draw against UD Caravaca.

José Manuel made his first team debut on 7 November 2021, replacing Yann Bodiger late into a 3–1 home defeat of Málaga CF in the Segunda División. Four days later, he extended his contract with the club until 2024.
