= Mohammed Sannie =

Ghanaian footballer

Personal information
- Date of birth: June 27, 1986 (age 40)
- Place of birth: Ghana
- Position: Goalkeeper

Team information
- Current team: Asante Kotoko
- Number: 12

Senior career*
Years	Team	Apps	(Gls)
2003–2008	Hearts of Oak	33	(0)
2008–	Asante Kotoko		

International career^{‡}
2005	Ghana	1	(0)
- * Club domestic league appearances and goals as of 7 August 2008 ‡ National team caps and goals as of 7 August 2008

Mohammed Sannie (born 27 June 1986) is a Ghanaian football goalkeeper currently playing at Asante Kotoko.

== Career ==
Sannie began his career 2004 in the OneTouch Premier League with Hearts of Oak and replaces Sammy Adjei.

On 22 November 2008 leave Hearts of Oak and moved to Asante Kotoko.

== International ==
Sannie played his one and only game for the Black Stars in 2005 at CAF Confederations Cup.

== Honours ==
- 2004: CAF Confederations Cup
- 2007: Promising Player of the Year award.
