= 2024 deaths in the United States (April–June) =

- Decades: 2000s; 2010s; 2020s; 2030s
- See also: History of the United States (2016–present); Timeline of United States history (2010–present); List of years in the United States

The following notable deaths in the United States occurred in April–June 2024. Names are reported under the date of death, in alphabetical order as set out in WP:NAMESORT. A typical entry reports information in the following sequence: Name, age, country of citizenship at birth and subsequent nationality (if applicable), what subject was noted for, year of birth (if known), and reference.

== April ==
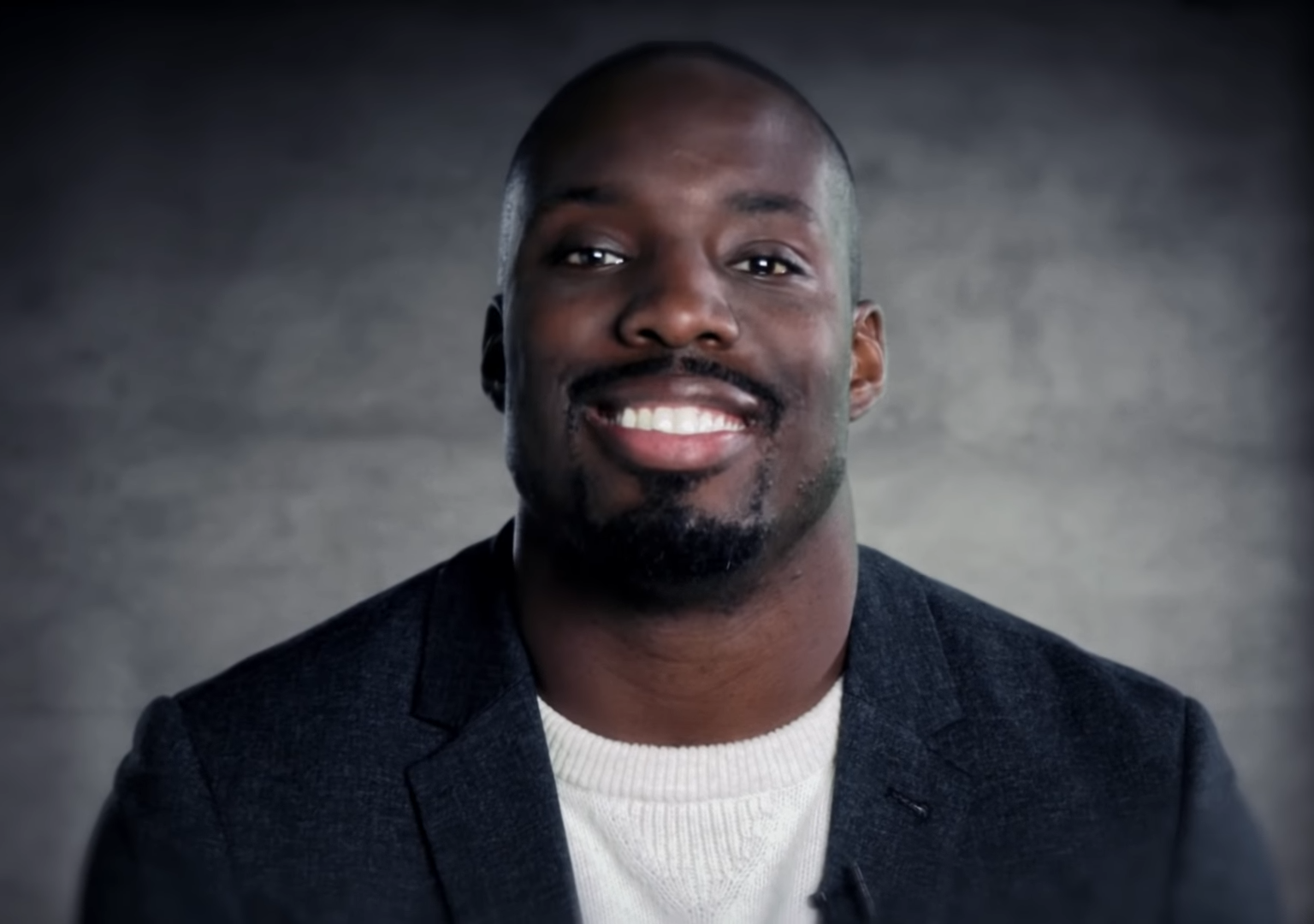
Vontae Davis

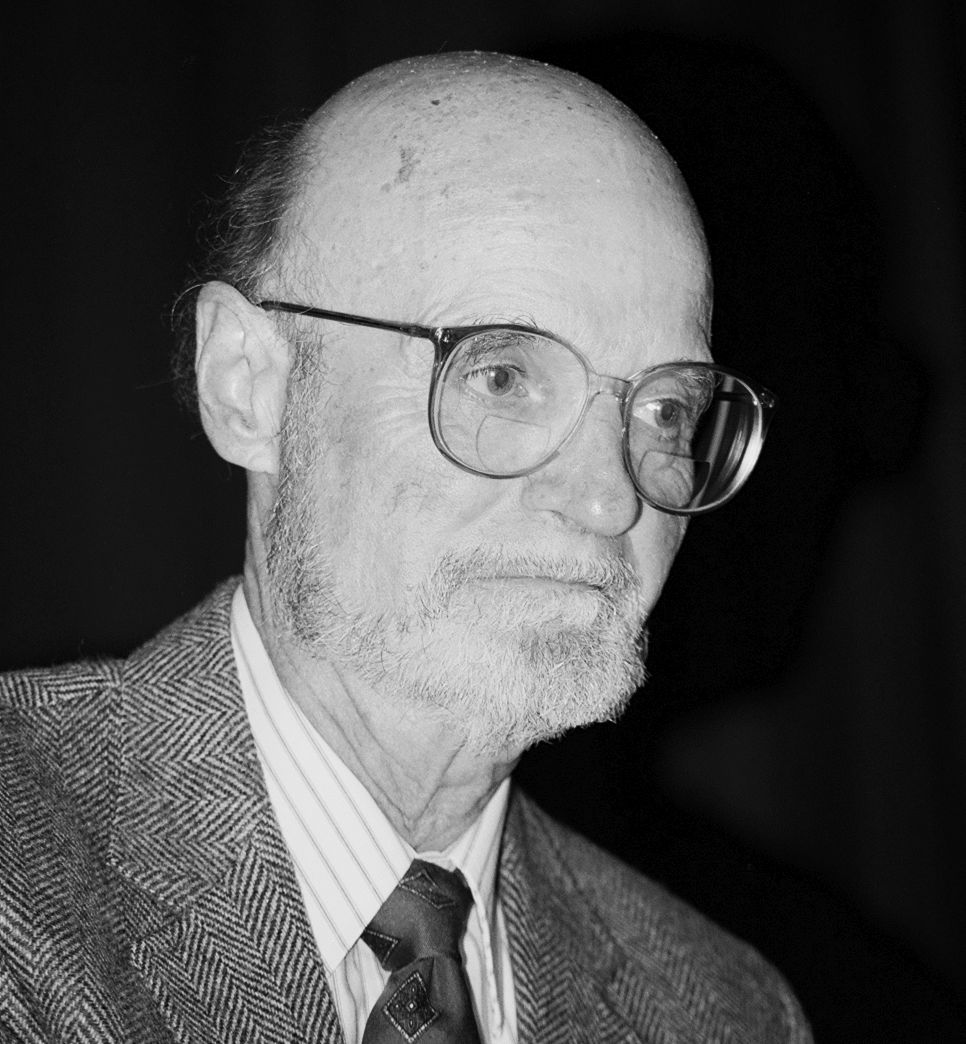
John Barth

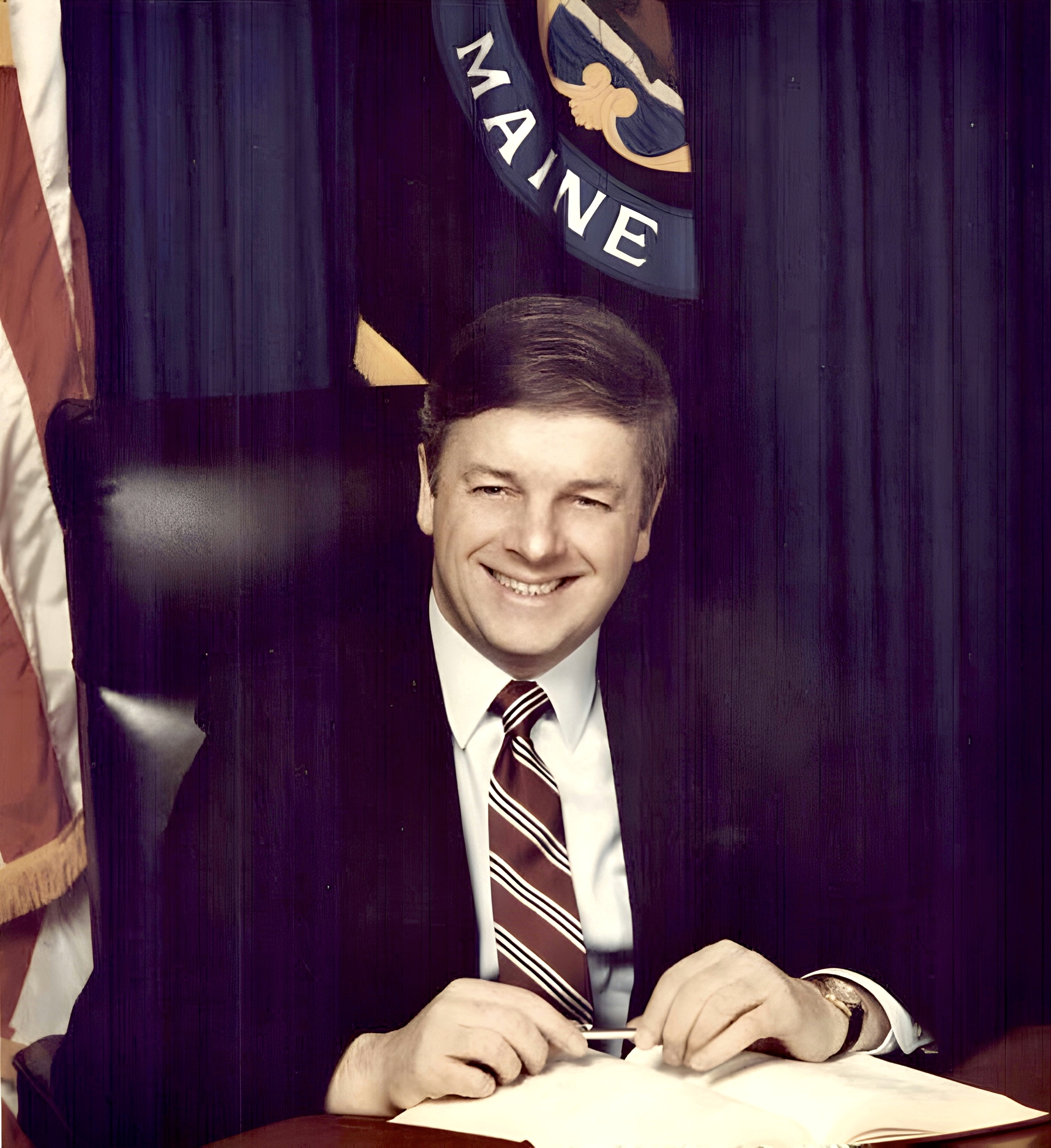
Joseph E. Brennan

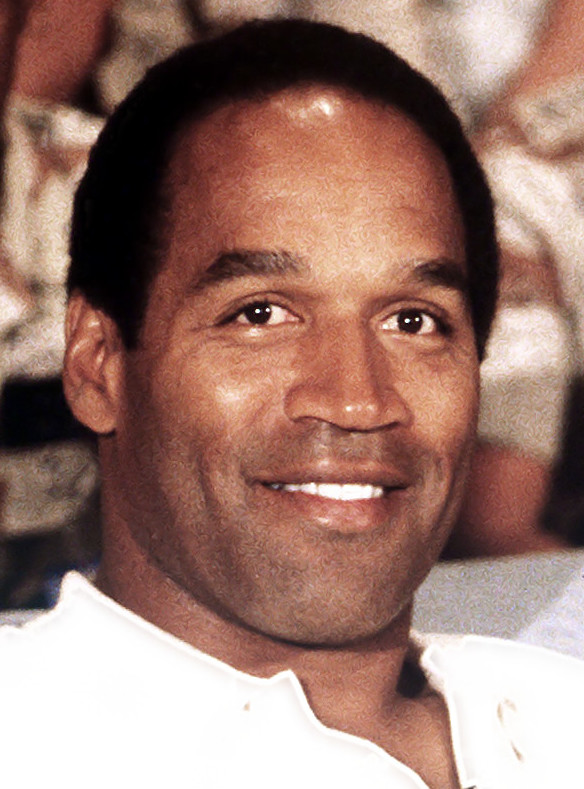
O. J. Simpson

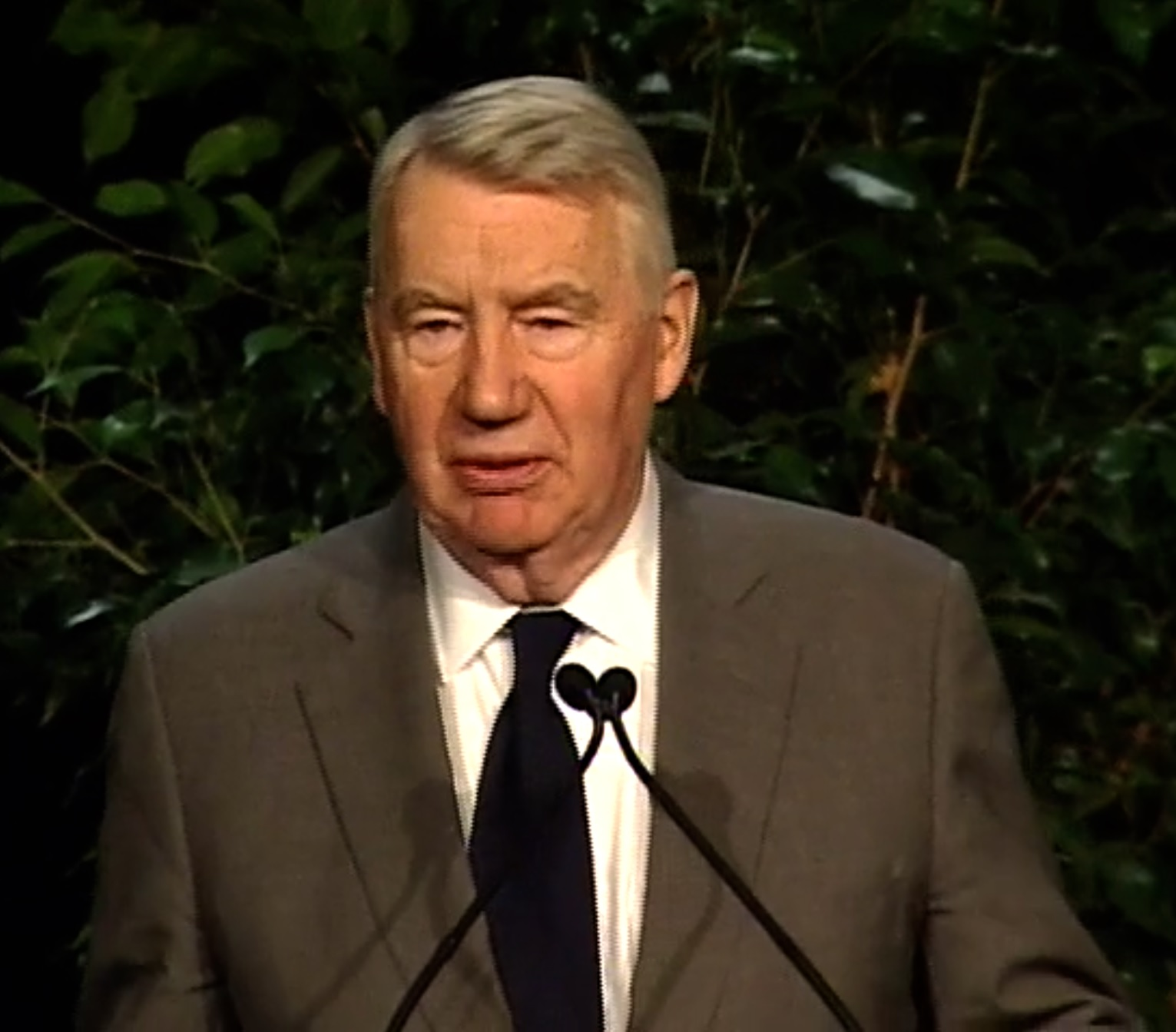
Robert MacNeil

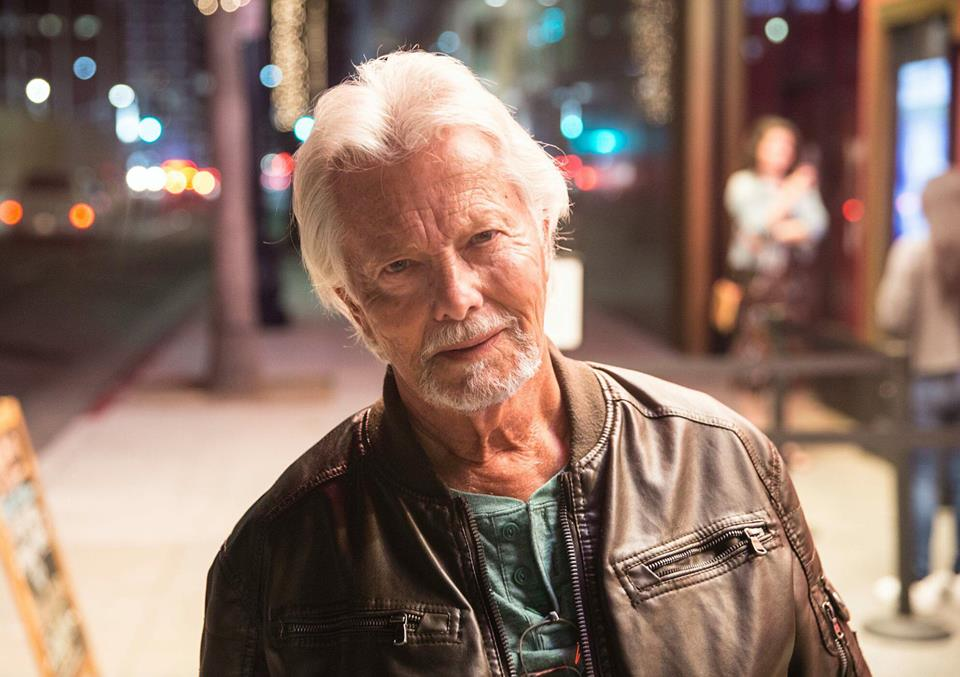
Ron Thompson

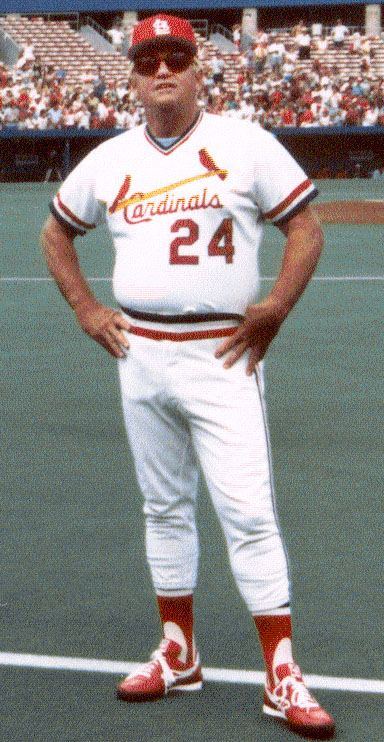
Whitey Herzog

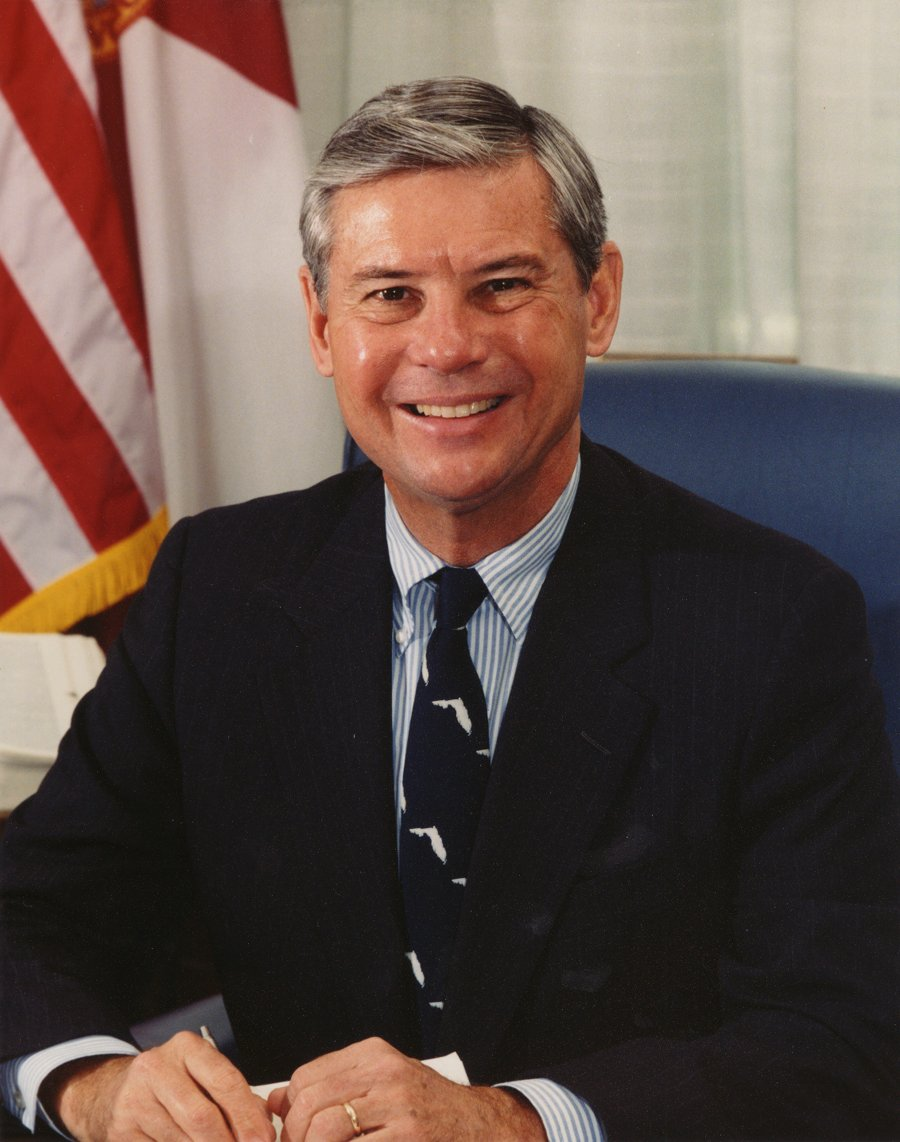
Bob Graham

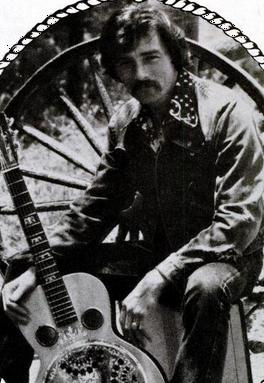
Dickey Betts

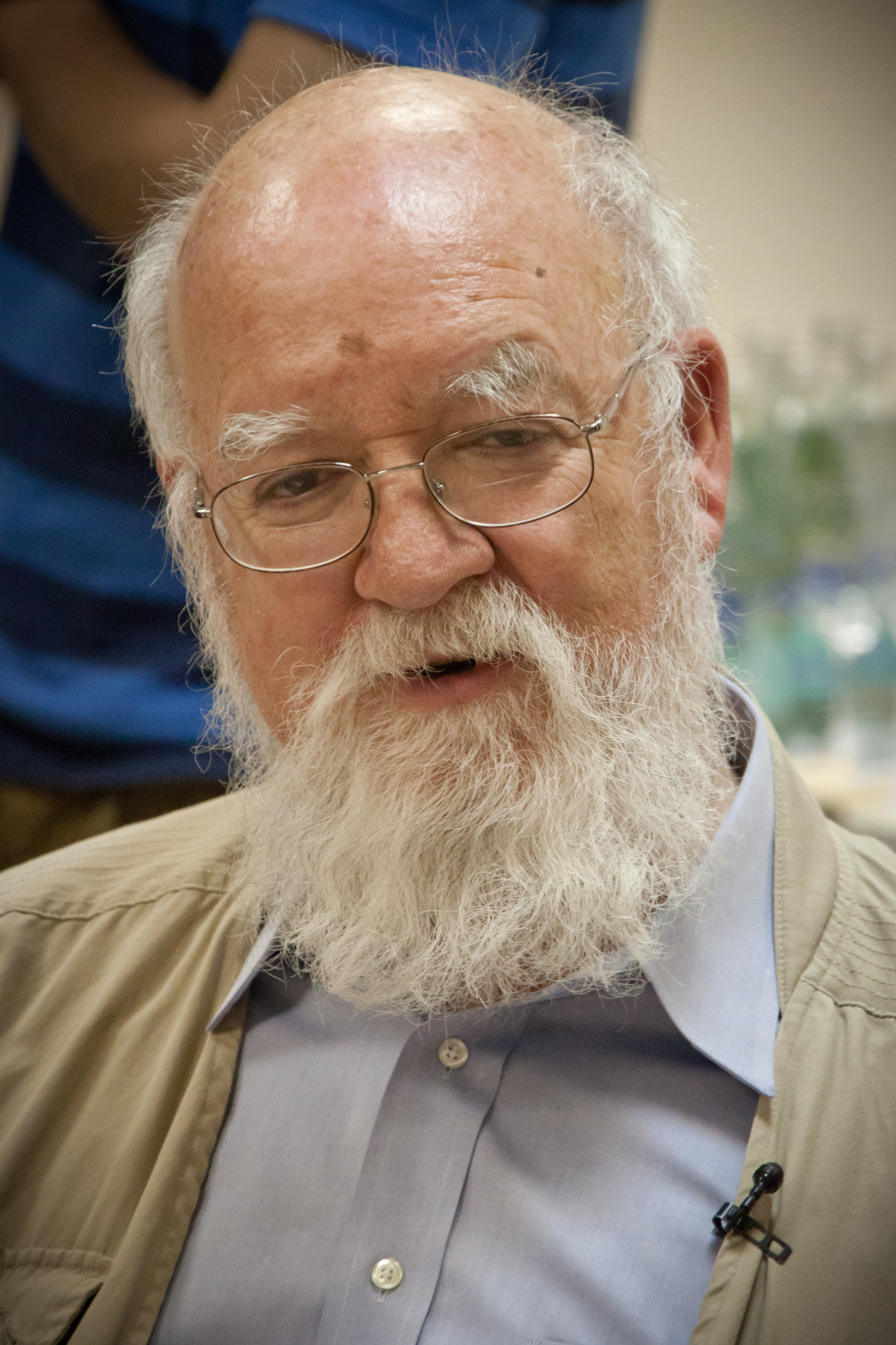
Daniel Dennett

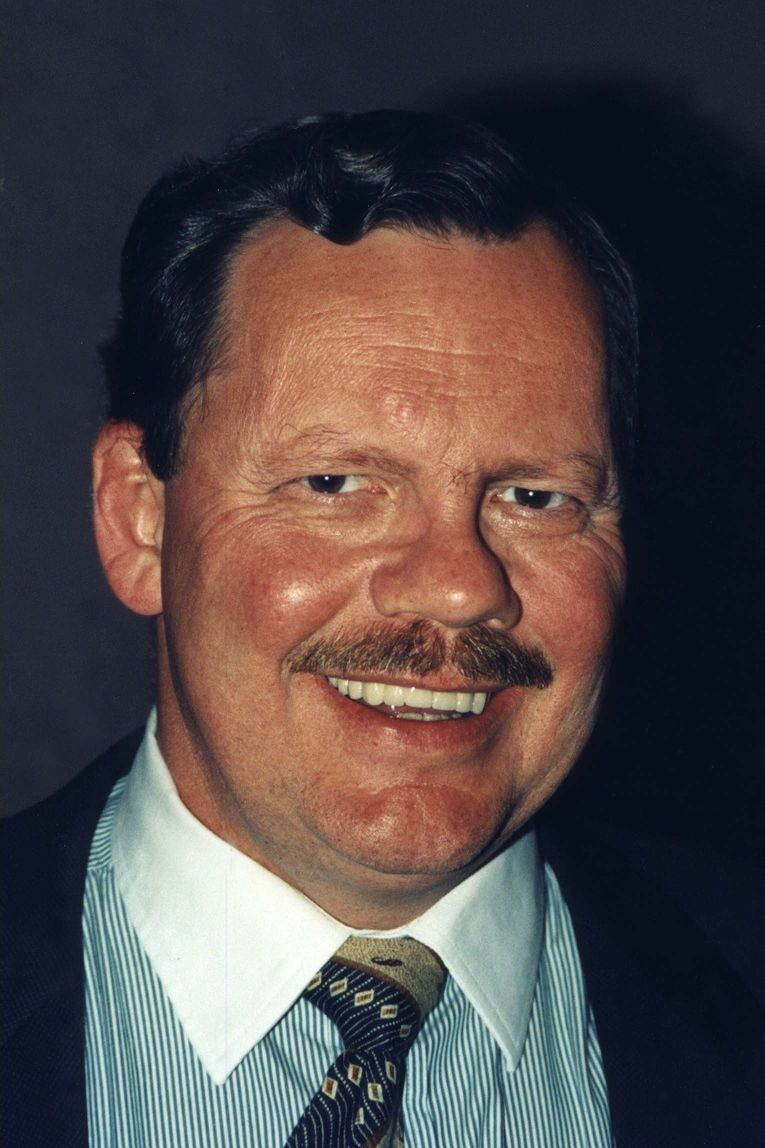
Terry A. Anderson

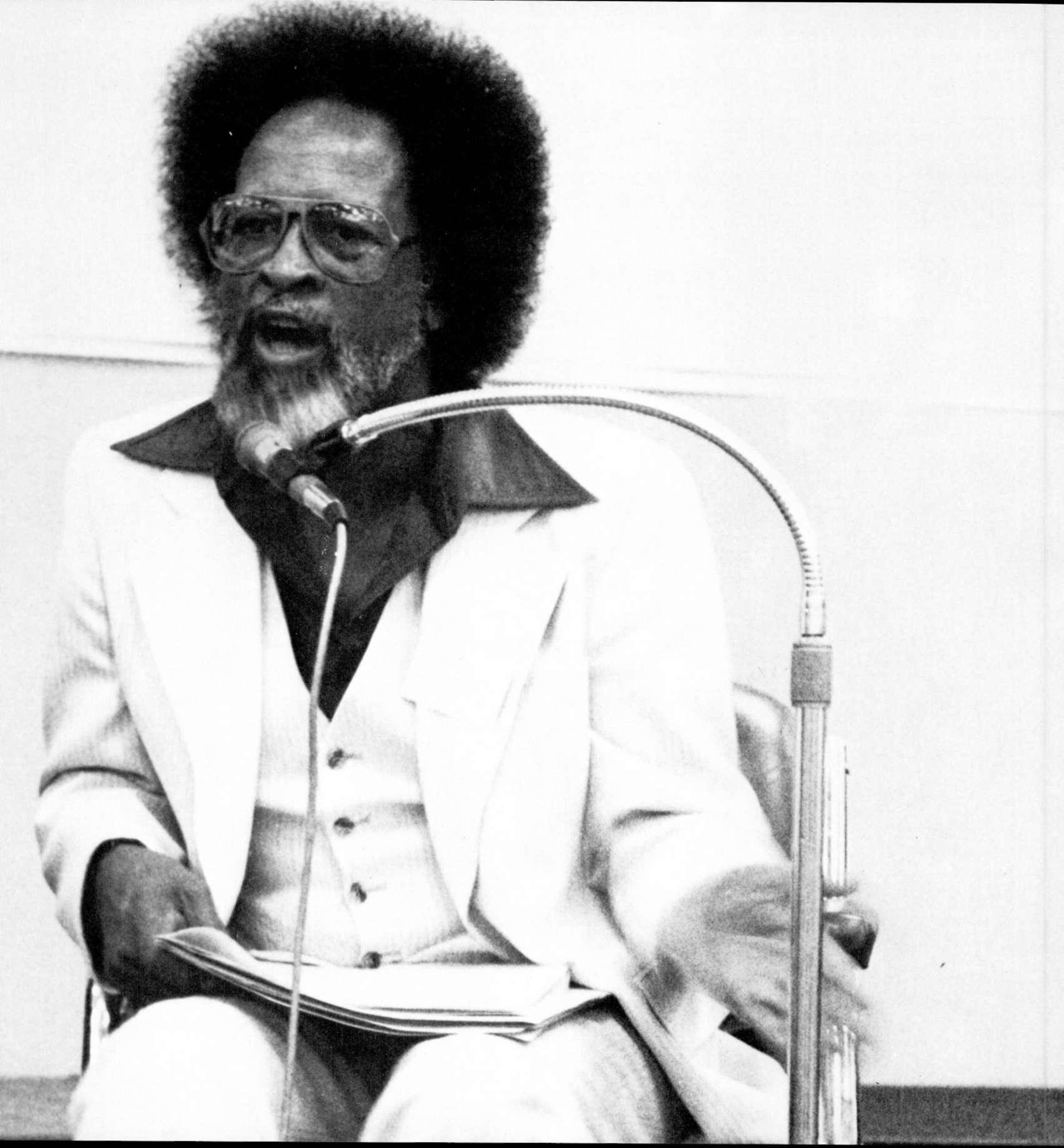
Cecil Williams

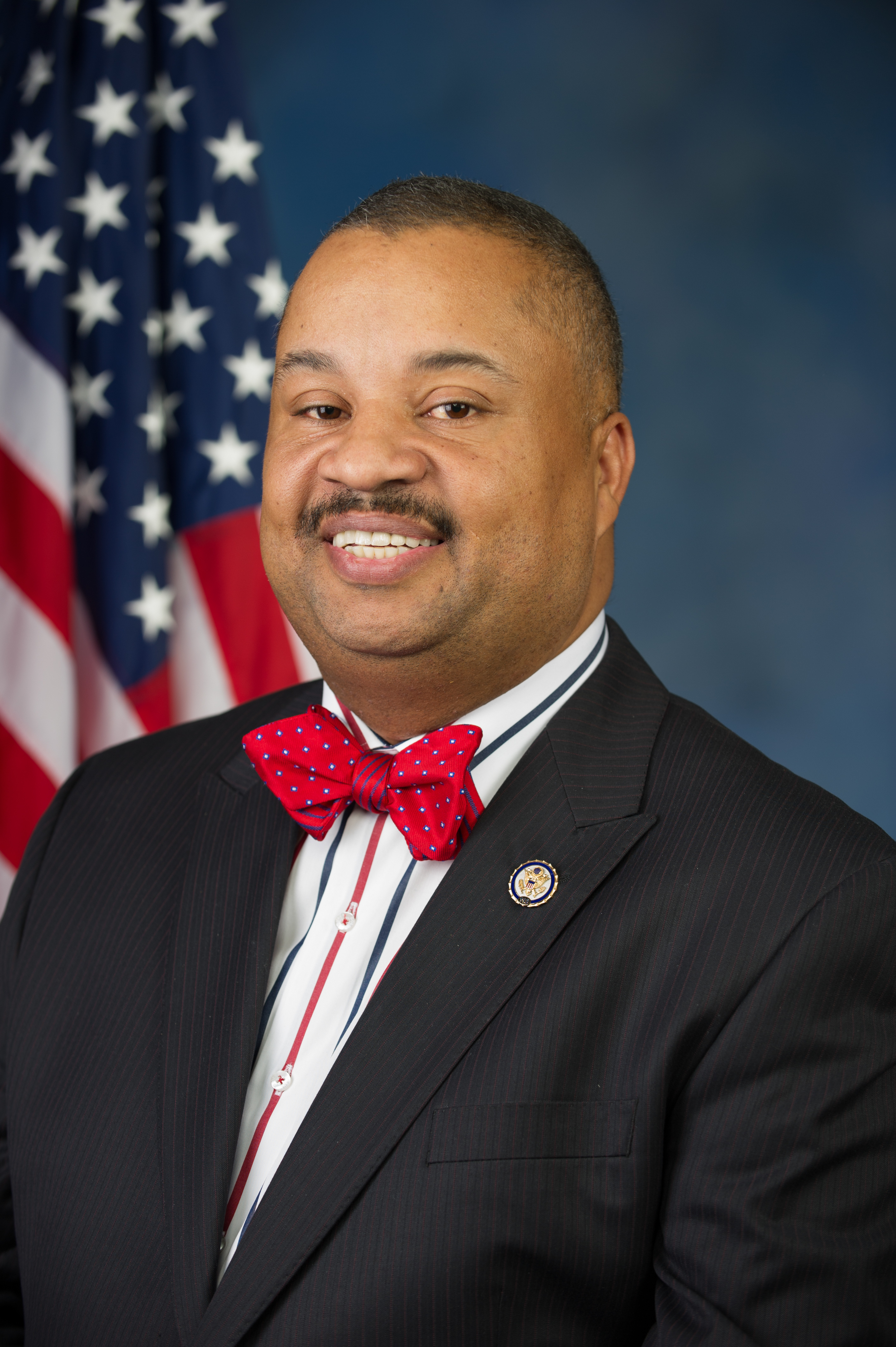
Donald Payne Jr.

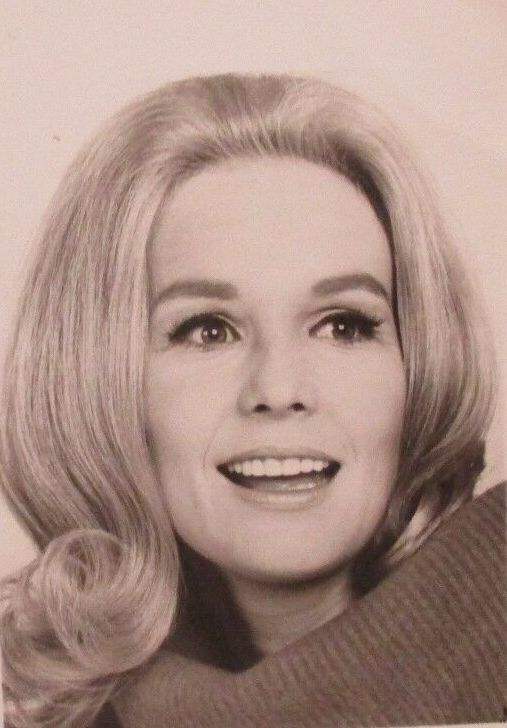
Marla Adams

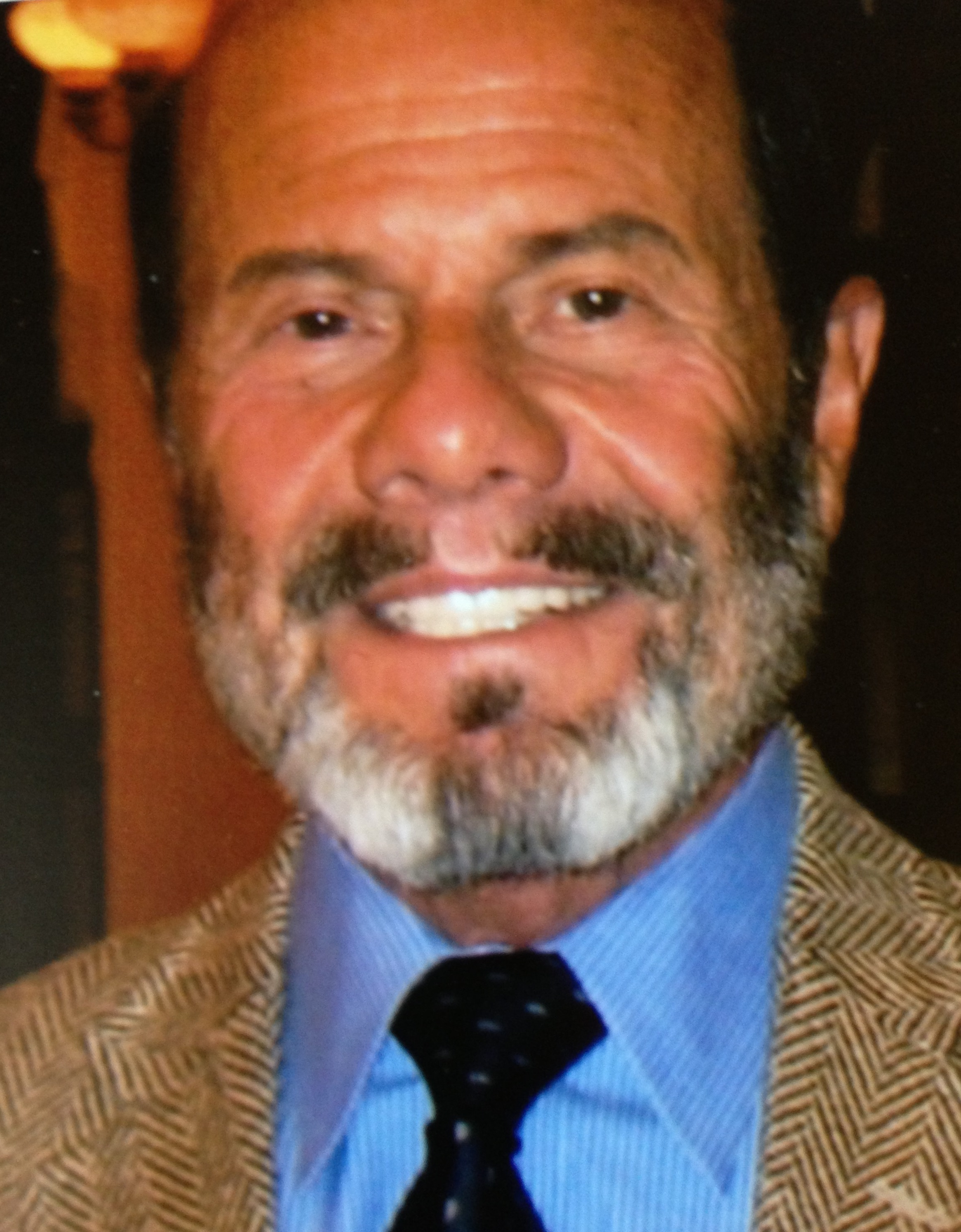
Zack Norman

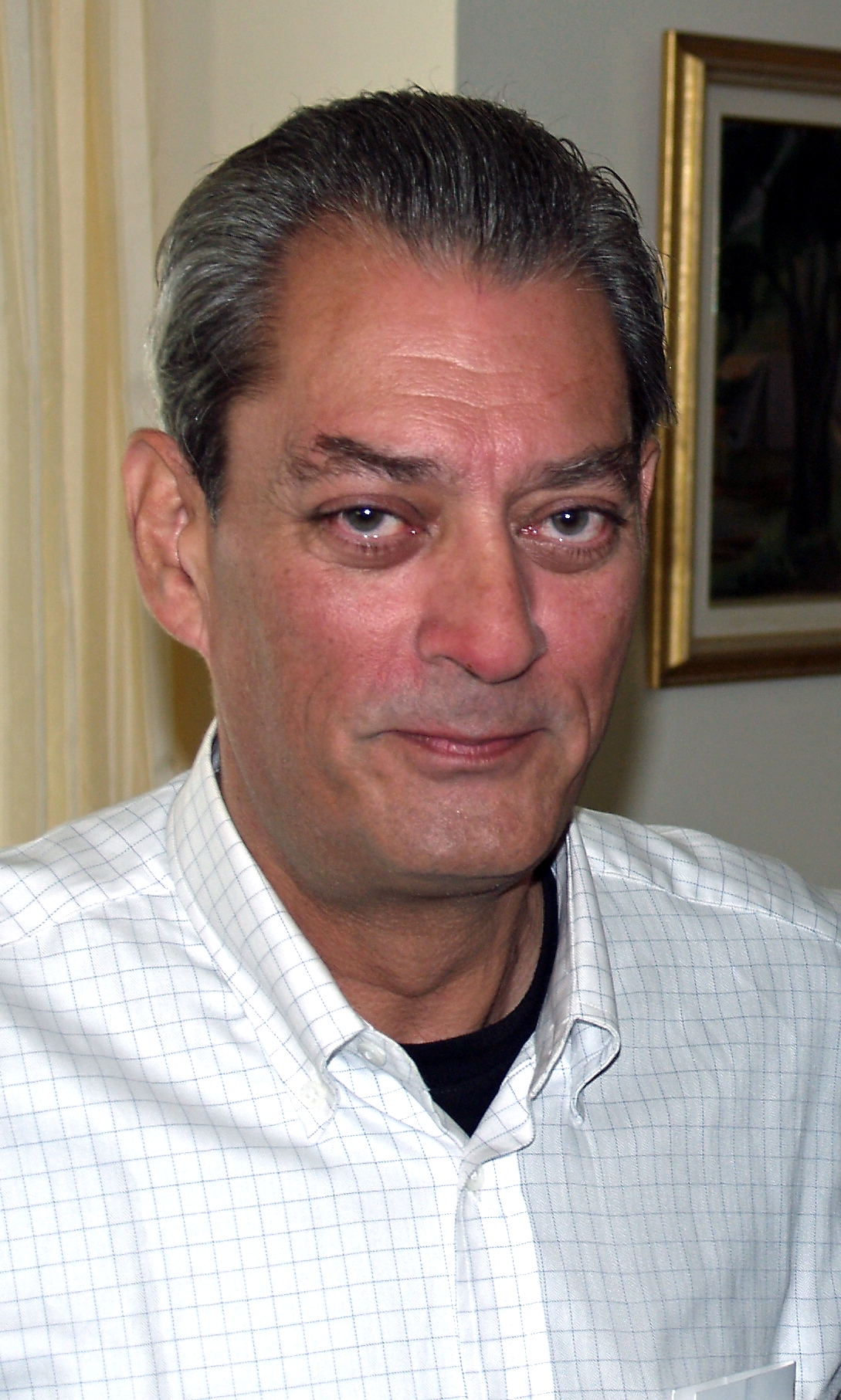
Paul Auster

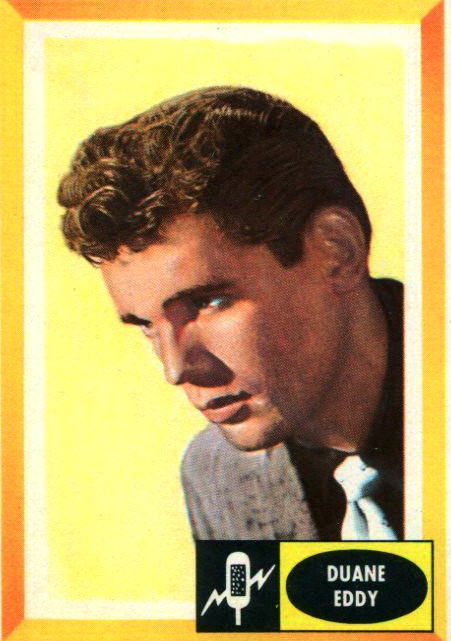
Duane Eddy

- April 1
  - Lou Conter, 102, naval commander, last survivor of the sinking of the USS Arizona (b. 1921)
  - Vontae Davis, 35, football player (Miami Dolphins, Indianapolis Colts, Buffalo Bills) (b. 1988)
  - Thomas Farr, 69, attorney (b. 1954)
  - Joe Flaherty, 82, actor (SCTV, Freaks and Geeks, Happy Gilmore), writer, and comedian (b. 1941)
  - Cal Larson, 93, politician, member of the Minnesota Senate (1987–2007) and House of Representatives (1967–1975) (b. 1930)
  - Ed Piskor, 41, comic book artist (Hip Hop Family Tree, Wizzywig, X-Men: Grand Design) (b. 1982)
  - Michael Ward, 57, musician (The Wallflowers, School of Fish) (b. 1967)
  - Pete Wilk, 58, baseball coach (Vermont Lake Monsters) (b. 1965/1966)
- April 2
  - Jerry Abbott, 81, country music songwriter and record producer (Pantera) (b. 1942)
  - John Barth, 93, writer (The Sot-Weed Factor, Giles Goat-Boy, Lost in the Funhouse) (b. 1930)
  - Christopher Durang, 75, playwright (Sister Mary Ignatius Explains It All for You, Vanya and Sonia and Masha and Spike) and Tony winner (2013) (b. 1949)
  - Michael C. Jensen, 84, economist (b. 1939)
  - Larry Lucchino, 78, baseball president (Boston Red Sox) (b. 1945)
  - Robert I. Marshall, 77, politician, member of the Delaware Senate (1979–2019) (b. 1946) (death announced on this date)
  - Judd Matheny, 53, politician, member of the Tennessee House of Representatives (2002–2018) (b. 1970)
  - C. J. Prentiss, 82, politician, member of the Ohio Senate (1999–2006) and House of Representatives (1991–1998) (b. 1941)
  - John Sinclair, 82, poet (b. 1941)
- April 3
  - Albert Heath, 88, jazz drummer (Heath Brothers) (b. 1935)
  - Mike Kolen, 76, football player (Miami Dolphins), Super Bowl winner (VII, VIII) (b. 1948)
- April 4
  - Larry Beightol, 81, football coach (Louisiana Tech Bulldogs) (b. 1942)
  - Thomas Gumbleton, 94, Roman Catholic prelate, auxiliary bishop of Detroit (1968–2006) (b. 1930)
  - Bruce Kessler, 88, director (The Gay Deceivers, The Monkees, McCloud) and racing driver (b. 1936)
  - Keith LeBlanc, 69, drummer (Little Axe, Tackhead) and music producer ("No Sell Out") (b. 1954)
  - Pat Zachry, 71, baseball player (Cincinnati Reds, New York Mets, Los Angeles Dodgers), World Series winner (1976) (b. 1952)
- April 5
  - Cecil Murray, 94, pastor and theologian (b. 1929/1930)
  - Toni Palermo, 91, American baseball player (Chicago Colleens, Springfield Sallies) (b. 1933)
  - C. J. Snare, 64, musician (FireHouse) and songwriter ("Love of a Lifetime", "When I Look into Your Eyes") (b. 1959)
  - Cole Brings Plenty, 27, actor (1923) (b. 1996/1997) (death announced on this date)
- April 6
  - Joseph E. Brennan, 89, politician, governor of Maine (1979–1987) and member of the U.S. House of Representatives (1987–1991) (b. 1934)
- April 7
  - Jerry Grote, 81, baseball player (New York Mets, Los Angeles Dodgers, Kansas City Royals), World Series winner (1969) (b. 1942)
  - Pat Hennen, 70, motorcycle racer, Finnish Grand Prix, 500cc winner (1976) (b. 1953)
  - Clarence "Frogman" Henry, 87, singer ("Ain't Got No Home", "(I Don't Know Why) But I Do", "You Always Hurt the One You Love") (b. 1937)
  - Harry Lee Hudspeth, 88, jurist, judge (1979–2016) and chief judge (1992–1999) of the U.S. District Court of Western Texas (b. 1935)
  - REX, 76–77, artist and illustrator (b. 1947) (death announced on this date)
  - Lori and George Schappell, 62, conjoined twins (b. 1961)
  - Karen Yarbrough, 73, politician, Cook County clerk (since 2018) and member of the Illinois House of Representatives (2001–2012) (b. 1950)
- April 8
  - Bill Gunter, 89, politician, member of the U.S. House of Representatives (1973–1975) and Florida Senate (1966–1972) (b. 1934)
  - Ralph Puckett, 97, Army officer, Medal of Honor recipient (b. 1926)
  - Victor Riley, 49, football player (Kansas City Chiefs, New Orleans Saints, Houston Texans) (b. 1974)
  - Bob Ellison, 91, television consultant (Becker, Wings, The Mary Tyler Moore Show), screenwriter and producer (b. 1932/1933) (death announced on this date)
- April 9
  - Patti Astor, 74, actress (Wild Style) and founder of Fun Gallery (b. 1950)
  - Carla Balenda, 98, actress (Sealed Cargo, Prince of Pirates, Phantom Stallion) (b. 1925)
  - William J. Byron, 96, Jesuit priest, president of the University of Scranton (1975–1982) and Catholic University of America (1982–1992) (b. 1927)
  - William Herbert Hunt, 95, oil billionaire (b. 1929)
  - Sheila Isham, 96, printmaker, painter and book artist (b. 1927)
  - Bob Lanese, 82, trumpeter (James Last Orchestra) (b. 1941)
  - Sturgis Nikides, 66, guitarist (b. 1958)
- April 10
  - David Goodstein, 85, physicist (b. 1939)
  - Mister Cee, 57, disc jockey, record producer and radio personality (b. 1966)
  - Frank Olson, 91, business executive (b. 1932)
  - Trina Robbins, 85, comic book artist and writer (It Ain't Me, Babe, Wimmen's Comix, Wonder Woman) (b. 1938)
  - Eric Sievers, 66, football player (San Diego Chargers, New England Patriots, Los Angeles Rams), cancer.
  - O. J. Simpson, 76, Hall of Fame football player (Buffalo Bills), actor (The Naked Gun), broadcaster and notable defendant (b. 1947)
  - Dan Wallin, 97, sound engineer (Woodstock, A Star Is Born, Star Trek) (b. 1927)
- April 11
  - Akebono Tarō, 54, sumo wrestler (b. 1969) (death announced on this date)
  - Bert Chaney, 96, politician, member of the Kansas Senate (1973–1984) and House of Representatives (1967–1972) (b. 1928)
  - Fritz Peterson, 82, baseball player (New York Yankees, Cleveland Indians, Texas Rangers) (b. 1942)
  - War Chant, 27, Thoroughbred racehorse (b. 1997)
  - Ted Wilson, 84, politician, mayor of Salt Lake City (1976–1985) (b. 1939)
  - Martin J. Wygod, 84, businessman and racehorse breeder (b. 1940)
- April 12
  - Eleanor Coppola, 87, film director (Hearts of Darkness: A Filmmaker's Apocalypse, Paris Can Wait, Love Is Love Is Love) (b. 1936)
  - Don Donoher, 92, college basketball coach and athletics administrator (Dayton Flyers) (b. 1932)
  - Olga Fikotová, 91, Czech-born discus thrower, Olympic champion (1956) (b. 1932)
  - Robert MacNeil, 93, Canadian-born Hall of Fame journalist (PBS NewsHour) and host (America at a Crossroads) (b. 1931)
  - Rico Wade, 52, music producer (Organized Noize) (b. 1971/1972)
- April 13
  - Larry Brown, 84, baseball player (Cleveland Indians, Oakland Athletics, Baltimore Orioles) (b. 1940)
  - Richard Horowitz, 75, film composer (Three Seasons, Tobruk, Any Given Sunday) (b. 1949)
  - Boris Kayser, 85, theoretical physicist (b. 1938)
  - Faith Ringgold, 93, painter (b. 1930)
  - Ron Thompson, 83, actor (No Place to Be Somebody, American Pop, Baretta), singer-songwriter and dancer (b. 1941)
- April 14
  - Dennis Covington, 75, author (Salvation on Sand Mountain), (b. 1948)
  - Ben Eldridge, 85, banjo player (The Seldom Scene) (b. 1938)
  - Ken Holtzman, 78, baseball player (Chicago Cubs, Oakland Athletics, New York Yankees) (b. 1945)
  - Calvin Keys, 82, jazz guitarist (b. 1942)
  - Beverly LaHaye, 94, Christian activist and author, founder of Concerned Women for America (b. 1929)
  - Lloyd Omdahl, 93, politician, North Dakota lieutenant governor (1987–1992) (b. 1931)
  - Steve Sloan, 79, football player (Alabama Crimson Tide, Atlanta Falcons) and coach (Texas Tech Red Raiders) (b. 1944)
  - Werner Spitz, 97, German-born forensic pathologist (b. 1926)
- April 15
  - Whitey Herzog, 92, Hall of Fame baseball player (Washington Senators), executive (New York Mets), and manager (St. Louis Cardinals) (b. 1931)
  - David Roselle, 84, mathematician and academic administrator, president of the University of Kentucky (1987–1989) and University of Delaware (1990–2007) (b. 1939)
  - Jerry Savelle, 77, televangelist and author (b. 1946)
- April 16
  - James A. Burg, 82, politician, member of the South Dakota House of Representatives (1975–1984) and Senate (1985–1986) (b. 1941)
  - Carl Erskine, 97, baseball player (Brooklyn/Los Angeles Dodgers), World Series champion (1955) (b. 1926)
  - Bob Graham, 87, politician, member of the U.S. Senate (1987–2005), governor of Florida (1979–1987) (b. 1936)
  - Jean-Marie Haessle, 84, French-born painter (b. 1939)
  - Barbara O. Jones, 82, actress (Daughters of the Dust, Freedom Road, Demon Seed) (b. 1941)
  - Anita Mackey, 110, social worker and supercentenarian. (b. 1914)
  - Ellen Ash Peters, 94, jurist, justice (1978–2000) and chief justice (1984–1996) of the Connecticut Supreme Court (b. 1930)
- April 17
  - Sue Chew, 66, politician, member of the Idaho House of Representatives (since 2006) (b. 1958)
  - Wally English, 89, American football coach (b. 1934)
  - Roy Davage Hudson, 93, academic, president of Hampton Institute (1970–1976) (b. 1930)
  - Fred Neulander, 82, rabbi and convicted criminal (b. 1941)
- April 18
  - Dickey Betts, 80, guitarist (The Allman Brothers Band) (b. 1943)
  - Archie Cooley, 85, college football coach (Mississippi Valley State Delta Devils, Arkansas–Pine Bluff Golden Lions, Paul Quinn Tigers) (b. 1939)
  - Glen Holden Sr., 96, polo player and diplomat, ambassador to Jamaica (1989) (b. 1927)
  - Steve Kille, musician (Dead Meadow).
  - Mandisa, 47, singer, reality television contestant (American Idol), Grammy winner (2014) (b. 1976)
  - Spencer Milligan, 86, actor (Land of the Lost, Sleeper, The Photographer) (b. 1937)
- April 19
  - Maxwell Azzarello, 37, protester (b. 1987)
  - Russell Bentley, 63–64, communist fighter (Vostok Battalion) (b. 1960) (death announced on this date)
  - Daniel Dennett, 82, philosopher (b. 1942)
  - David McCarty, 54, baseball player (Minnesota Twins, San Francisco Giants, Boston Red Sox), World Series champion (2004) (b. 1969)
  - Charles Parsons, 91, philosopher (b. 1933)
  - Eddie Sutton, 59, singer (Leeway) (b. 1964/1965)
  - Bill Tobin, 83, football player (Houston Oilers) and executive (Chicago Bears, Indianapolis Colts) (b. 1941)
- April 20
  - G. T. Blankenship, 96, lawyer and politician, Oklahoma attorney general (1967–1971) and member of the Oklahoma House of Representatives (1961–1966) (b. 1928)
  - Michael Cuscuna, 75, jazz record producer and music journalist (DownBeat), co-founder of Mosaic Records, Grammy winner (1993, 1998, 2002) (b. 1948)
  - Roman Gabriel, 83, Hall of Fame football player (Los Angeles Rams, Philadelphia Eagles) and actor (The Undefeated) (b. 1940)
  - David Pryor, 89, politician, governor of Arkansas (1975–1979), member of the U.S. Senate (1979–1997) and the House of Representatives (1966–1973) (b. 1934)
  - Howie Schwab, 63, television personality (Stump the Schwab), producer (ESPN), and writer (Fox Sports) (b. 1960)
- April 21
  - Terry A. Anderson, 76, journalist (Associated Press) (b. 1947)
  - Ray Garton, 61, novelist (b. 1962)
  - Alex Hassilev, 91, musician (The Limeliters) and actor (The Russians Are Coming the Russians Are Coming) (b. 1932)
  - Robin M. Hogarth, 81, British-born psychologist (b. 1942)
  - Chan Romero, 82, singer-songwriter ("Hippy Hippy Shake") and guitarist (b. 1941)
  - Jerome Rothenberg, 92, poet (b. 1931)
- April 22
  - Arthur Whittington, 68, football player (Oakland Raiders, Buffalo Bills) (b. 1955)
  - Cecil Williams, 94, pastor, community leader and author (b. 1929)
  - Jay Robert Nash, 86, author (The Motion Picture Guide) (b. 1937)
- April 23
  - Terry Carter, 95, actor (Foxy Brown, McCloud, Battlestar Galactica) (b. 1929)
  - Florian Chmielewski, 97, musician and politician, member (1971–1997) and president (1987) of the Minnesota Senate (b. 1927)
  - Delaine Eastin, 76, politician, member of the California State Assembly (1986–1994) (b. 1947)
  - Robert Kane, 85, philosopher (b. 1938)
  - Charlie Siler, 94, politician, member of the Kentucky House of Representatives (1985–1991, 1995–2011) (b. 1929)
  - Helen Vendler, 90, literary critic (b. 1933)
- April 24
  - Ron Cerrudo, 79, golfer (b. 1945)
  - Adele Faber, 96, author (b. 1928)
  - Donald Payne Jr., 65, politician, member of the U.S. House of Representatives (since 2012) (b. 1958)
  - Donald Petersen, 97, businessman, CEO of the Ford Motor Company (1985–1990) (b. 1926)
- April 25
  - Marla Adams, 85, actress (The Secret Storm, The Young and the Restless, Generations) (b. 1938)
  - Earl M. Baker, 84, politician, member of the Pennsylvania Senate (1989–1995) (b. 1940)
  - Korey Cunningham, 28, football player (New England Patriots, New York Giants) (b. 1995)
  - George Seligman, 96, mathematician (b. 1927)
- April 26
  - Ruben Douglas, 44, basketball player (Fortitudo Bologna, Dynamo Moscow, Valencia) (b. 1979)
  - Donald Laub, 89, plastic surgeon, founder of Interplast (b. 1935)
  - Aaron Thomas, 86, football player (San Francisco 49ers, New York Giants) (b. 1937)
  - Frank Wakefield, 89, mandolin player (b. 1934)
- April 27
  - J. Gary Cooper, 87, politician, member of the Alabama House of Representatives (1974–1978) and assistant secretary of the Air Force (Manpower & Reserve Affairs) (1989–1992) (b. 1936)
  - James E. Henshaw, 92, politician, member of the Oklahoma House of Representatives (1981–1995) (b. 1931)
  - Joseph H. McGee Jr., 95, politician, member of the South Carolina House of Representatives (1963–1968) (b. 1929)
  - Frederick N. Six, 95, jurist, justice of the Kansas Supreme Court (1988–2003) (b. 1929)
- April 28
  - Ivan Argüelles, 85, poet (b. 1939)
  - William Calley, 80, war criminal (My Lai massacre) (b. 1943)
  - Norman Carol, 95, violinist and concertmaster (Philadelphia Orchestra) (b. 1928)
  - Zack Norman, 83, comedian, film producer (Tracks), and actor (Romancing the Stone, Cadillac Man) (b. 1940)
  - Joe Thomas, 68, music producer, businessman and songwriter (b. 1956)
  - Bob Tyler, 91, Hall of Fame college football coach (Mississippi State Bulldogs) (b. 1932)
  - Daniel E. Winstead, 78, politician, member of the South Carolina House of Representatives (1979–1990) (b. 1945)
- April 29
  - Wally Dallenbach Sr., 87, Hall of Fame racing driver (CART) (b. 1936)
  - Peter Demetz, 101, Czechoslovak-born Germanist and author (b. 1922)
  - Charles Pryor, 64, politician, member of the Missouri House of Representatives (1993–2001) (b. 1959)
  - Red Giant, 20, Thoroughbred racehorse (b. 2004) (death announced on this date)
  - Jan Haag, 90, filmmaker, artist and writer (b. 1933)
  - Billy Reil, 44, professional wrestler (JAPW) (b. 1979)
- April 30
  - Paul Auster, 77, novelist (The New York Trilogy), film director and screenwriter (b. 1947)
  - Richard J. Carling, 87, politician, member of the Utah Senate (1973, 1975–1990) and House of Representatives (1966–1973) (b. 1937)
  - Duane Eddy, 86, Hall of Fame guitarist ("Rebel-'Rouser", "Peter Gunn") and Grammy winner (1986) (b. 1938)
  - Norma Howard, 65, Choctaw artist (b. 1958)
  - Andrea Shundi, 89, Albanian-born agronomist (b. 1934)
  - Alice Holloway Young, 100, educator (b. 1923)

== May ==
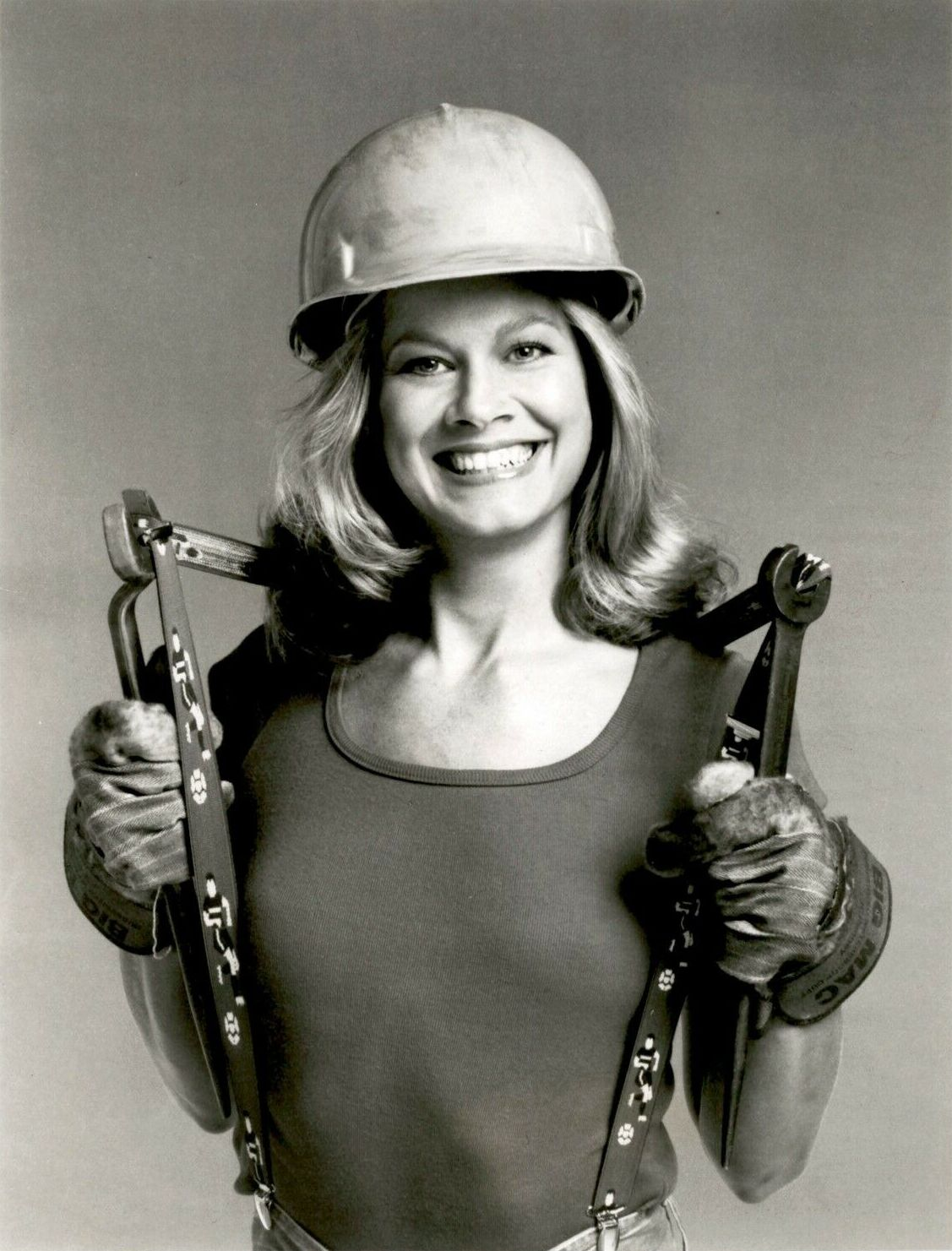
Susan Buckner

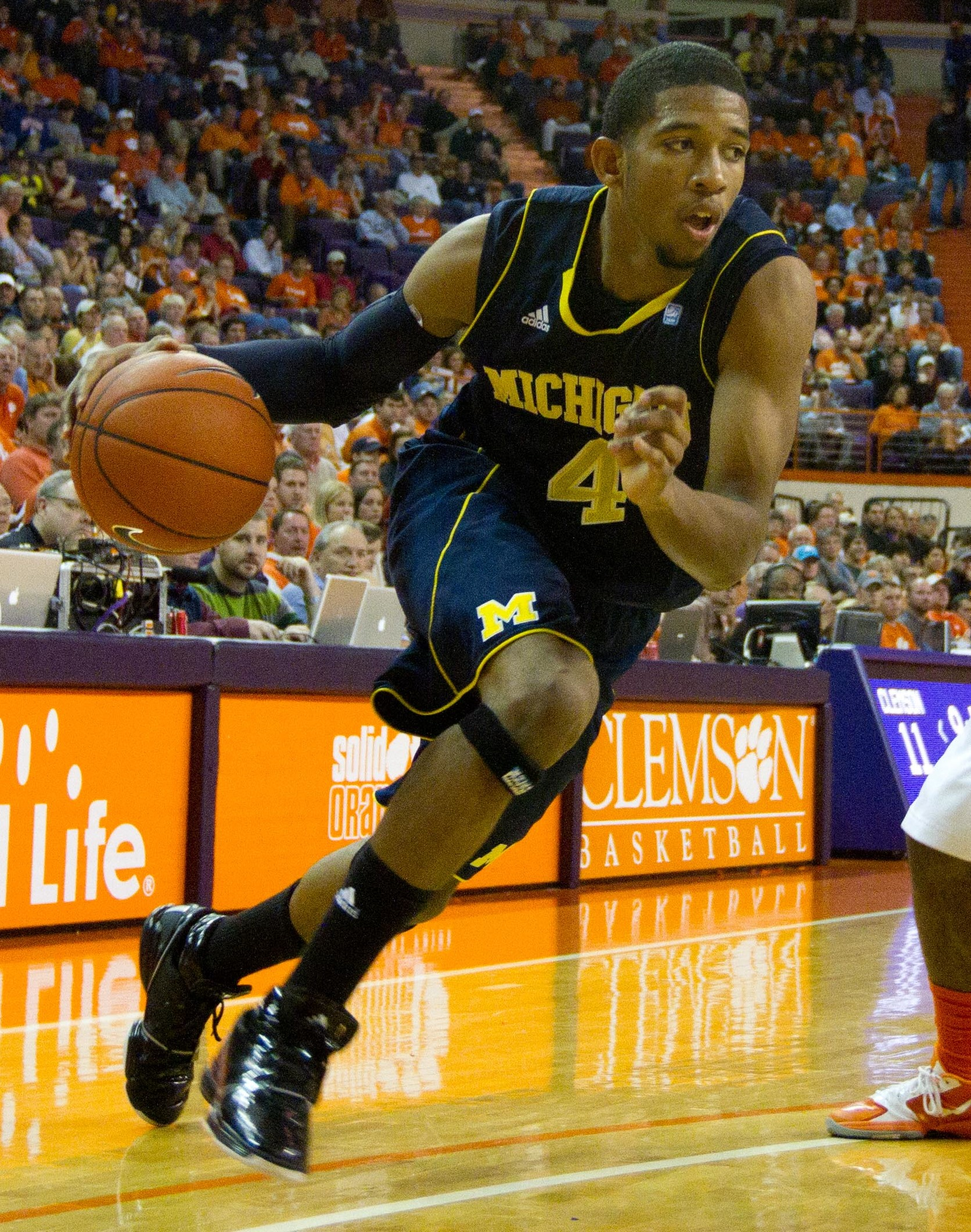
Darius Morris

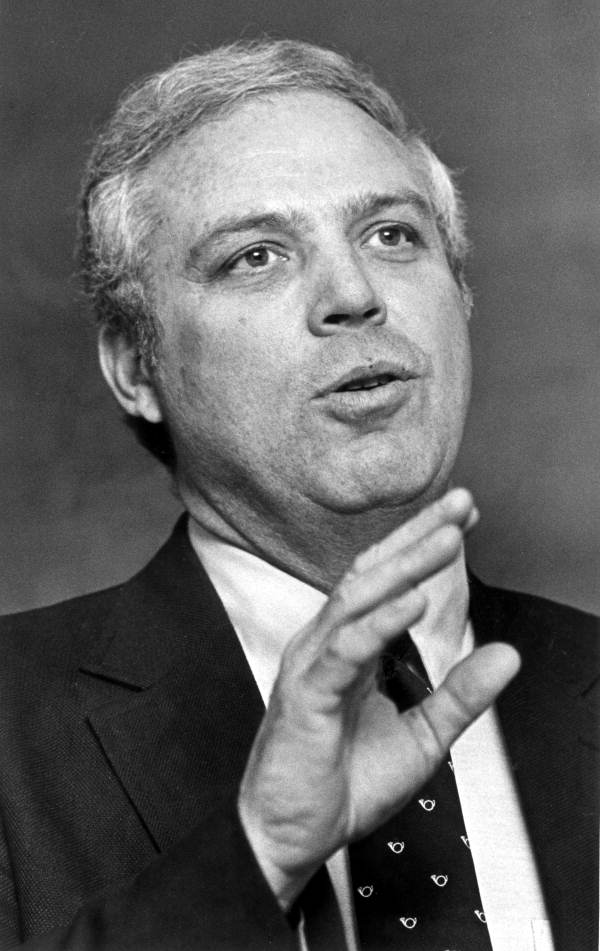
Hootie Ingram

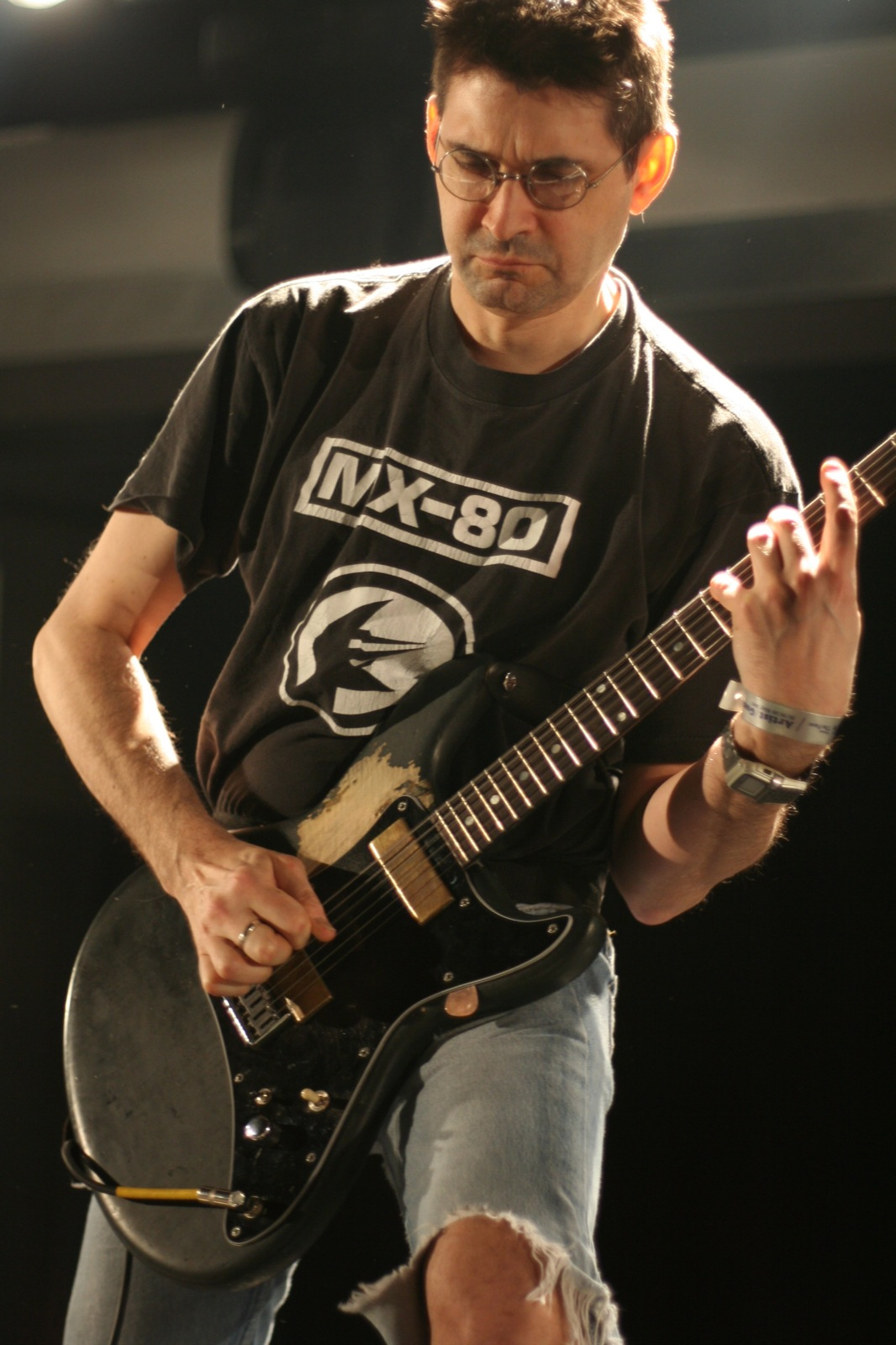
Steve Albini

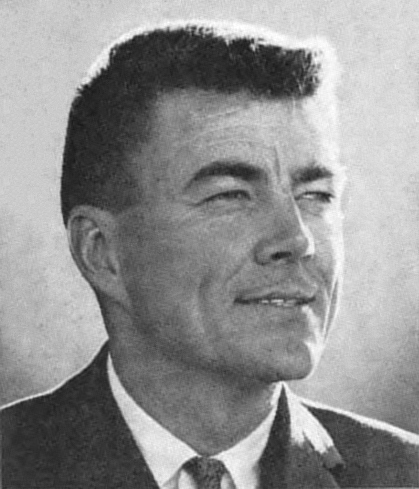
Pete McCloskey

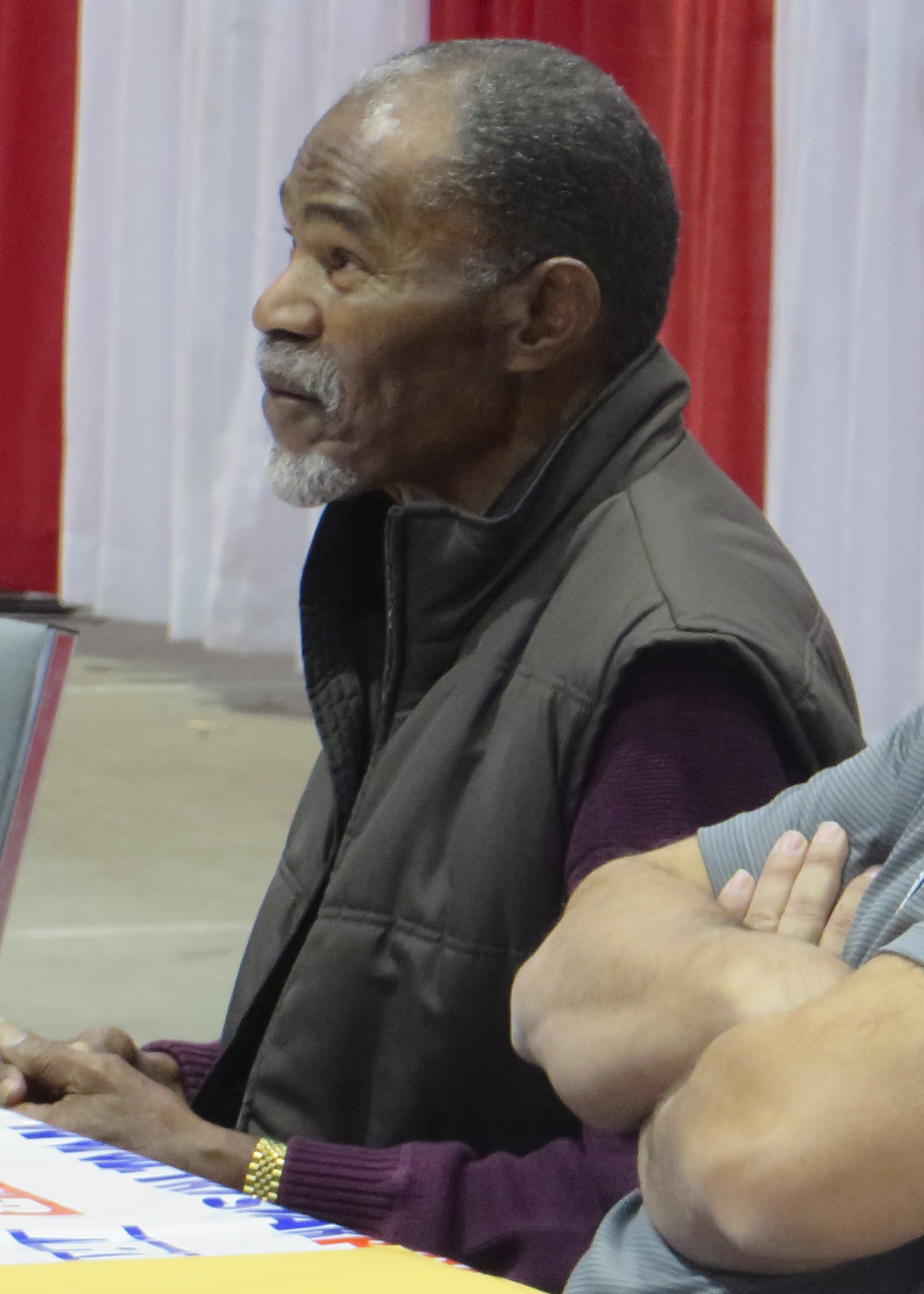
Jimmy Johnson

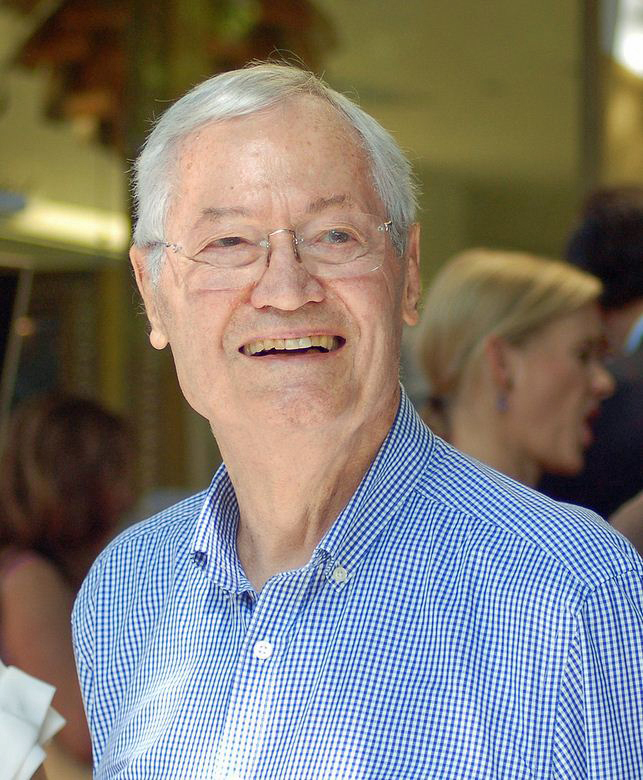
Roger Corman

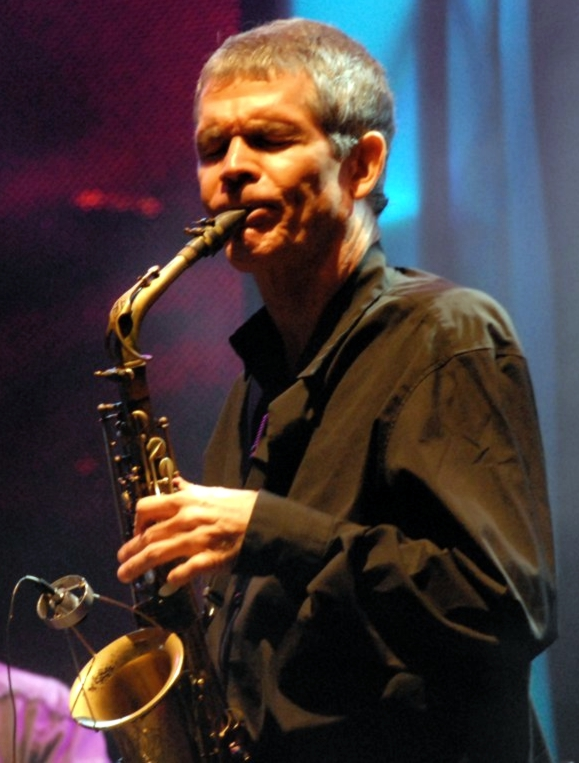
David Sanborn

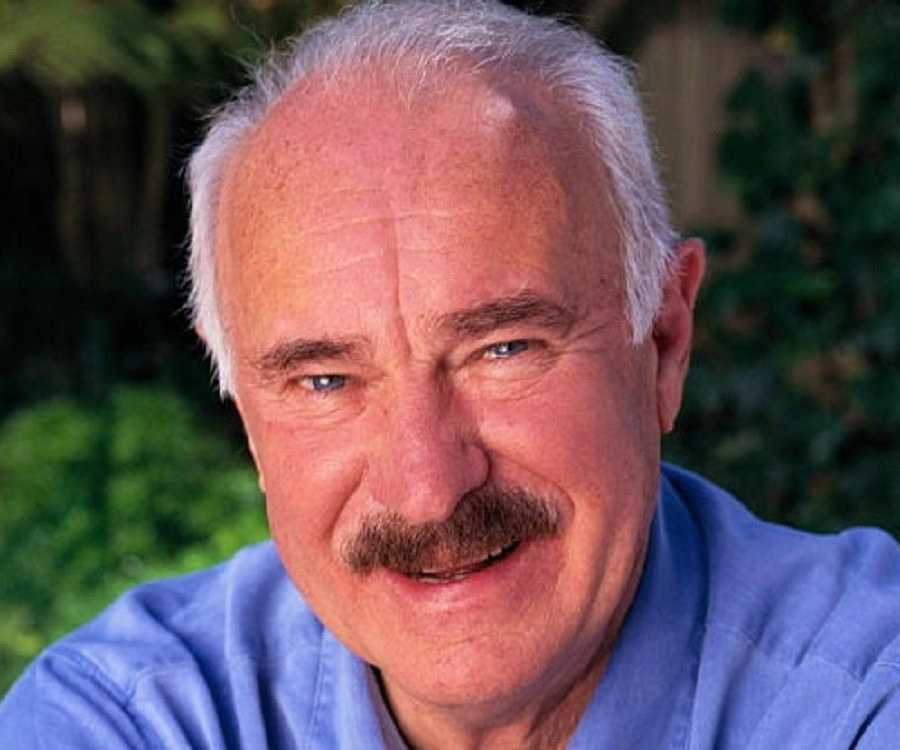
Dabney Coleman

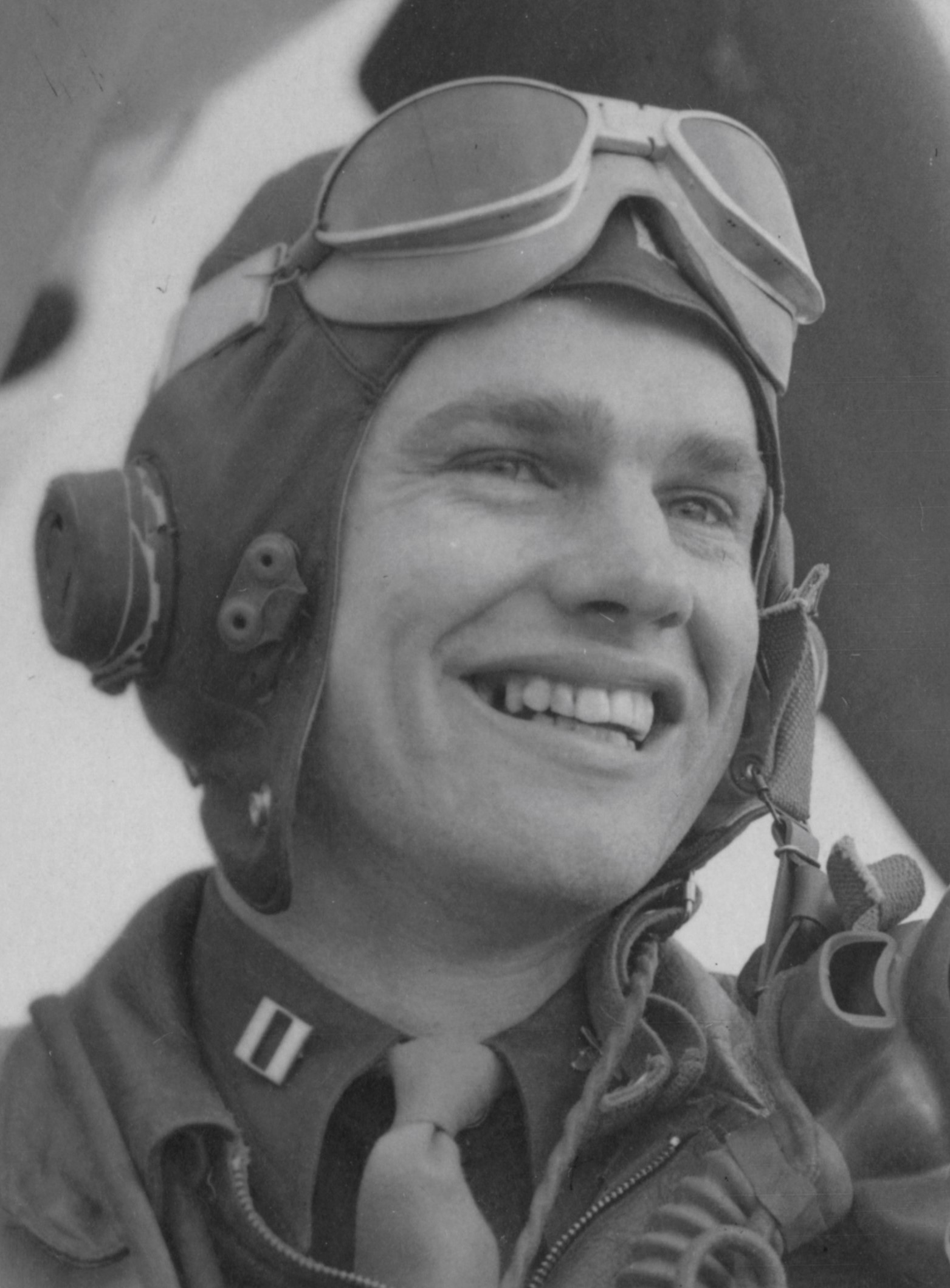
Bud Anderson

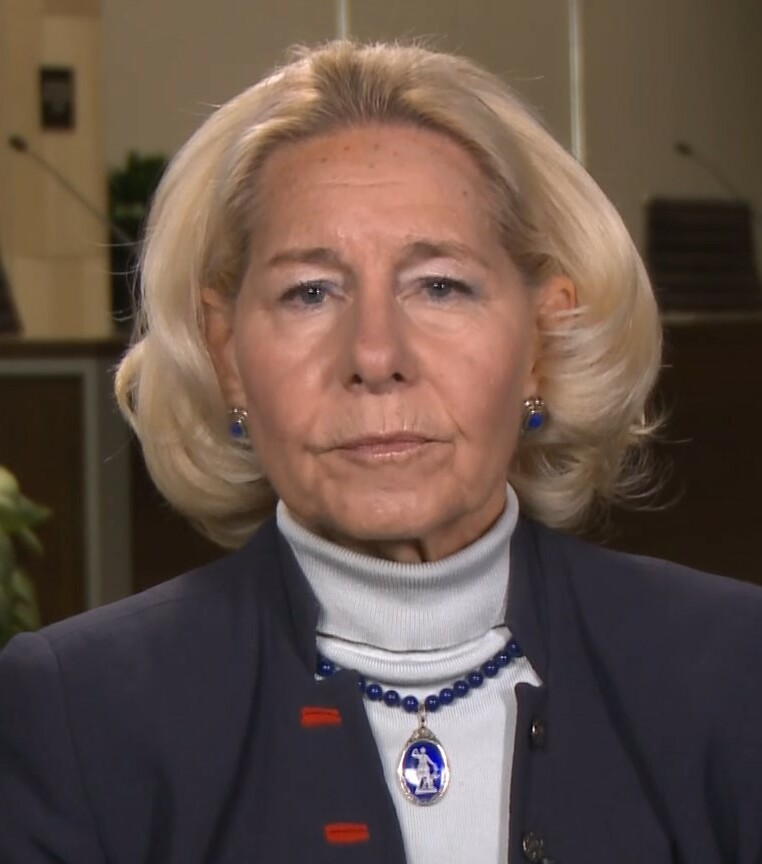
Gene E. K. Pratter

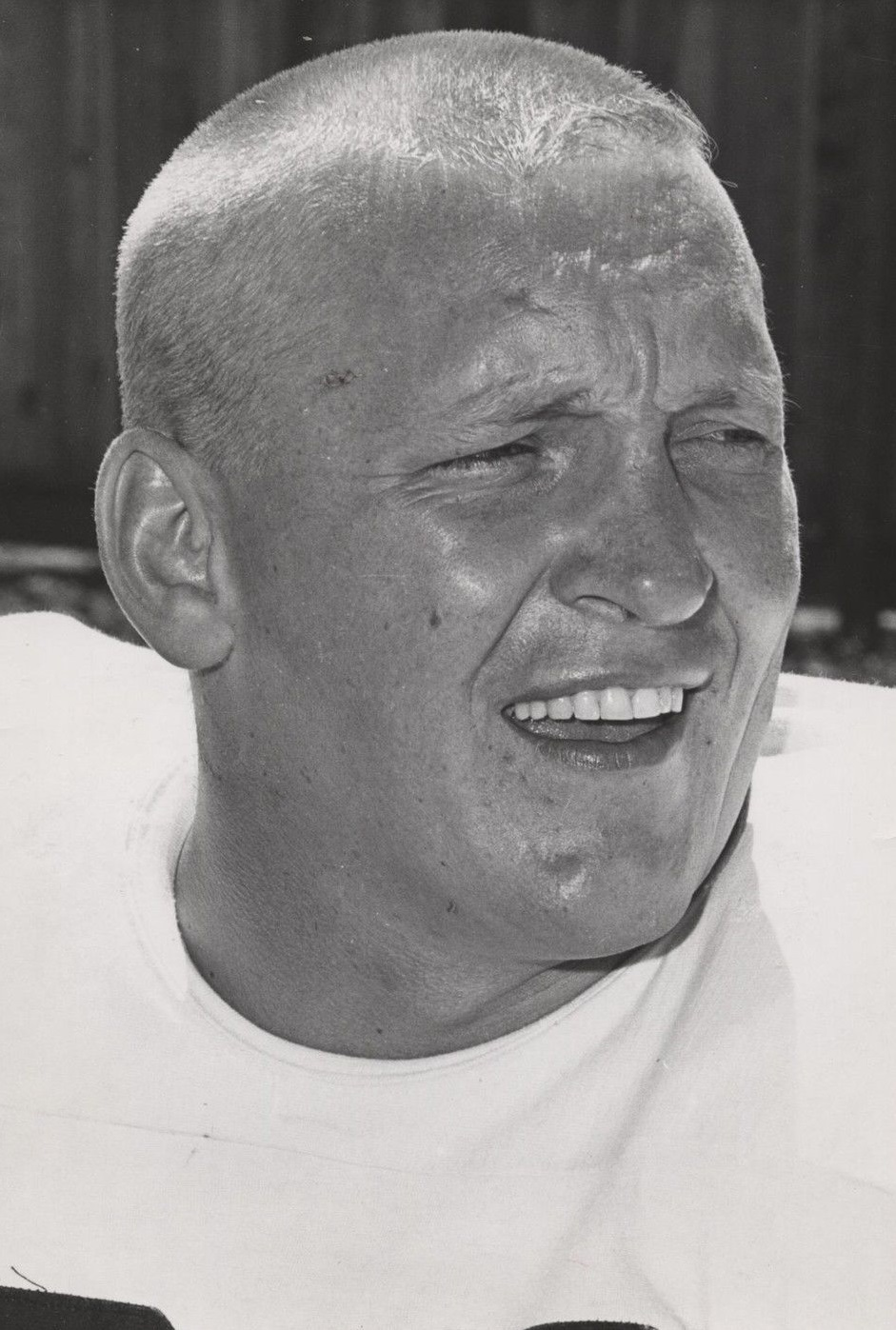
Jim Otto

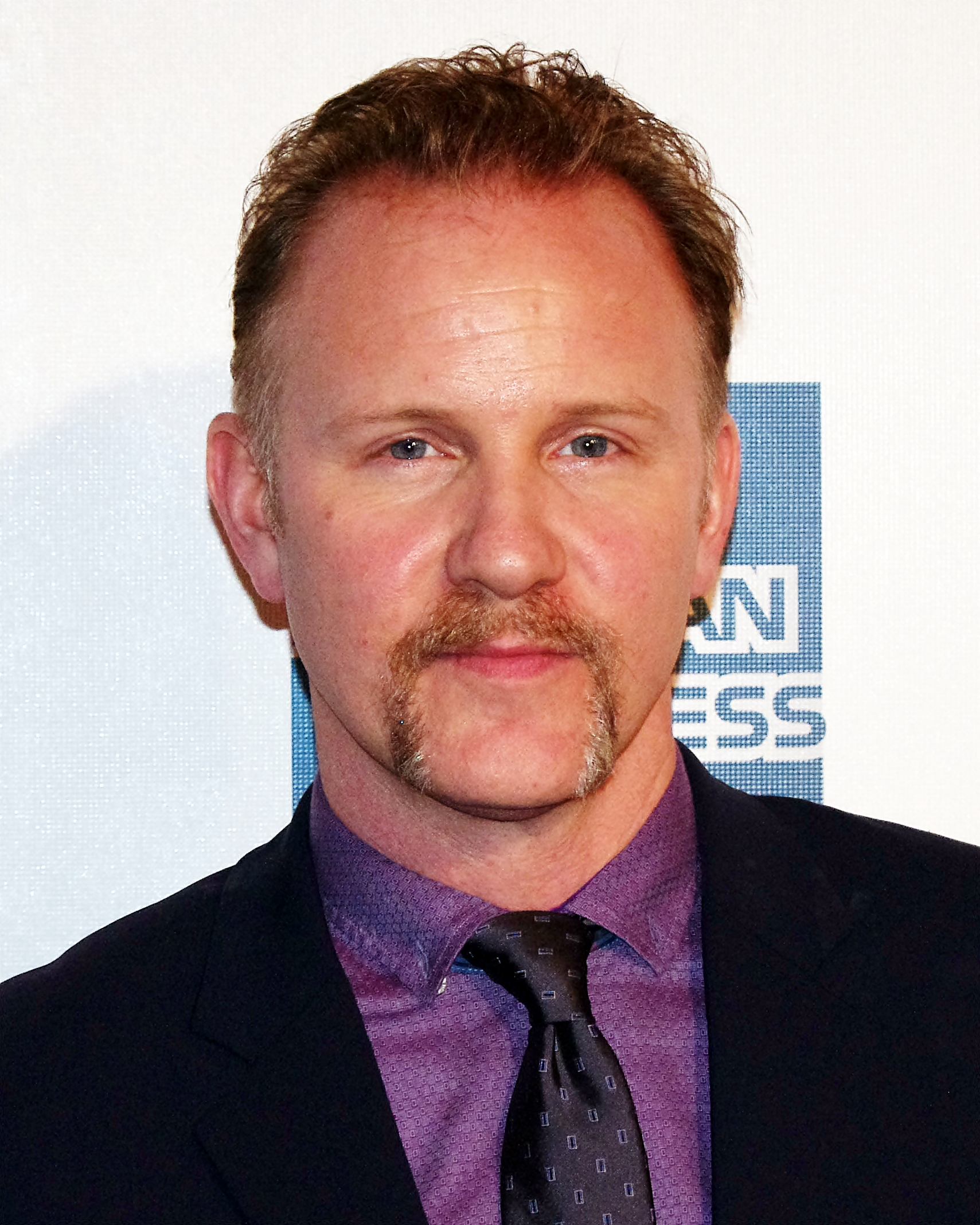
Morgan Spurlock

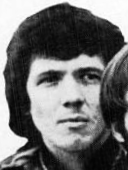
Doug Ingle

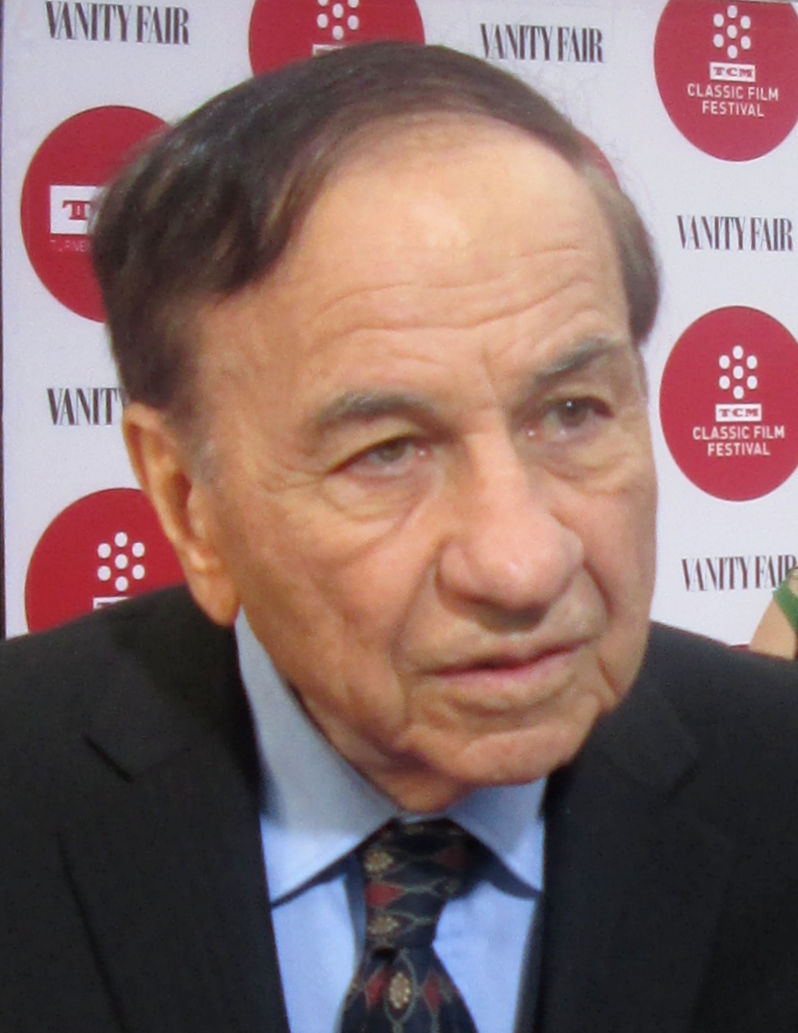
Richard M. Sherman

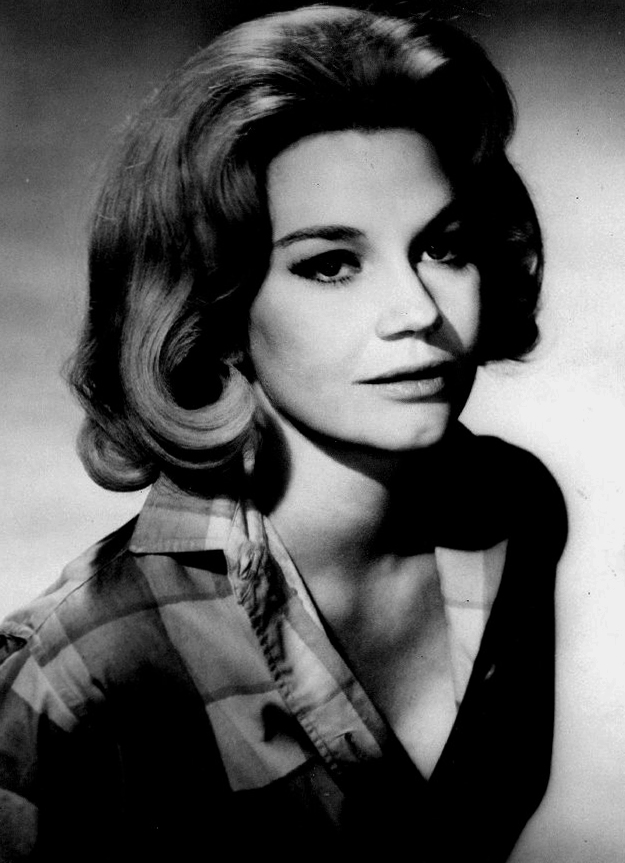
Elizabeth MacRae

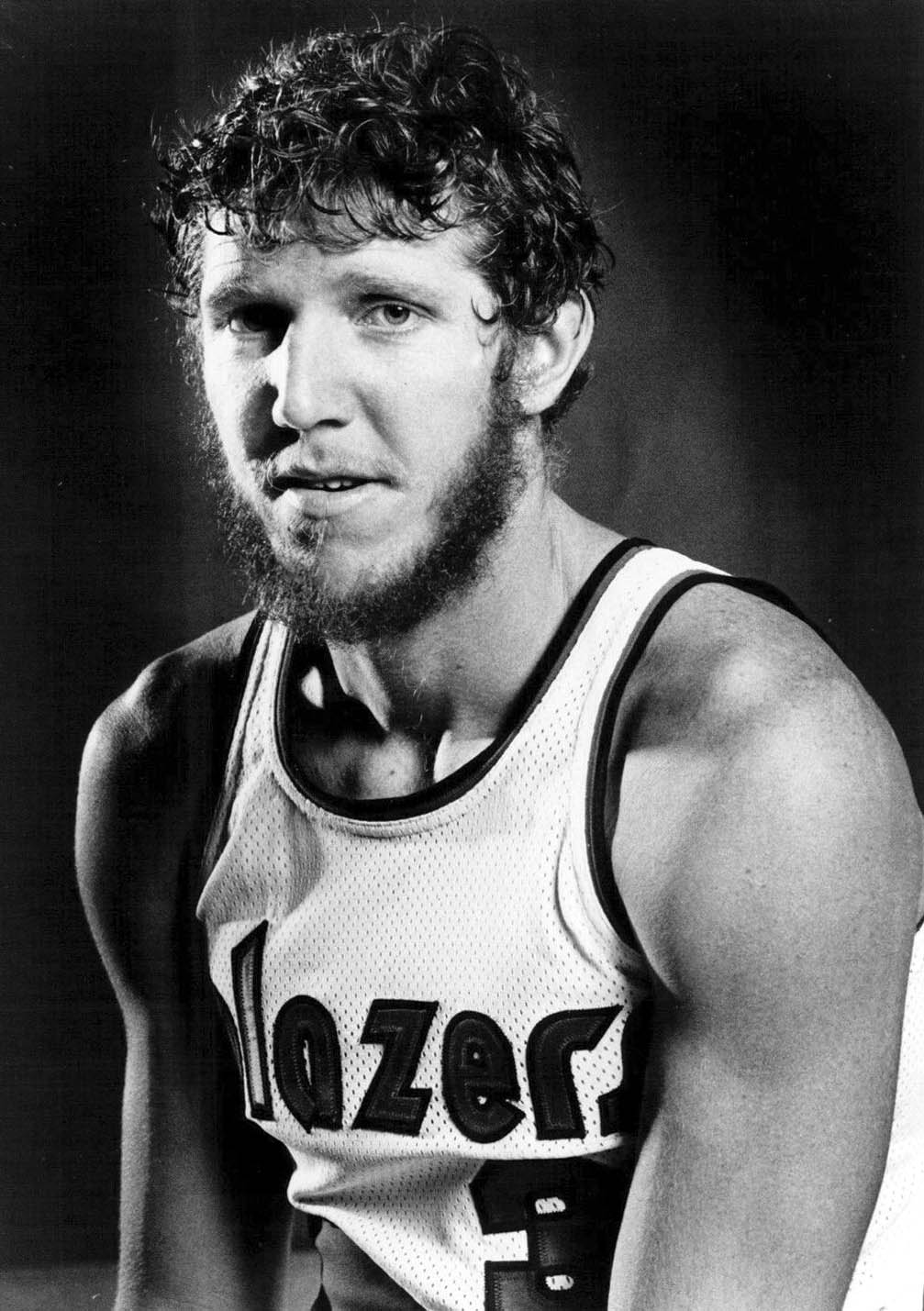
Bill Walton

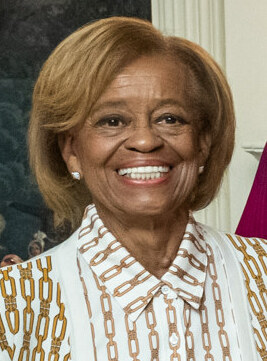
Marian Robinson

- May 1
  - Richard E. Cook, 93, Mormon general authority, member of the Second Quorum of the Seventy (1997–2001), CFO of Perpetual Education Fund (2001–2012) (b. 1930)
  - Richard Maloof, 84, musician (Les Brown, Lawrence Welk) (b. 1940)
  - Doyle Niemann, 77, prosecutor, public administrator, and politician, member of the Maryland House of Delegates (2003–2015) (b. 1947)
  - Dallas Penn, 53, fashion designer, musician and internet personality (b. 1970)
  - Joe Shipley, 88, baseball player (San Francisco Giants, Chicago White Sox) (b. 1935)
- May 2
  - Susan Buckner, 72, actress (Grease, Deadly Blessing) and beauty pageant winner (Miss Washington) (b. 1952)
  - Gary Floyd, 71, singer (Dicks, Sister Double Happiness) (b. 1952/1953)
  - David Konstan, 83, classicist (b. 1940)
  - Edgar Lansbury, 94, British-born theatre producer (The Subject Was Roses), Tony winner (1960) (b. 1930)
  - John Pisano, 93, jazz guitarist (b. 1931)
  - Roxanne, 95, actress (The Seven Year Itch) and model (Beat the Clock) (b. 1929)
- May 3
  - Obi Ezeh, 36, football player (Michigan Wolverines) (b. 1988)
  - Jim Mills, 57, banjo player (b. 1967)
  - Moorhead C. Kennedy Jr., 93, Foreign Service officer and hostage survivor (Iran hostage crisis) (b. 1930)
  - Dick Rutan, 85, aviator (b. 1938)
- May 4
  - Bob Avellini, 70, football player (Chicago Bears) (b. 1953)
  - Dan Castellano, 77, sportswriter (The Star-Ledger) (b. 1946/1947)
  - Judith G. Garber, 62, diplomat, ambassador to Latvia (2009–2012) and Cyprus (2019–2022) (b. 1961)
  - Darius Morris, 33, basketball player (Los Angeles Lakers, Philadelphia 76ers, Michigan Wolverines) (b. 1991)
  - Yechiel Perr, 89, rabbi (b. 1935)
  - Frank Shrontz, 92, corporate executive, CEO of Boeing (1986–1996) and assistant secretary of defense for sustainment (1976–1977) (b. 1931)
  - Frank Stella, 87, painter, sculptor and printmaker (b. 1936)
- May 5
  - Jeannie Epper, 83, actress (Foxy Brown) and stuntwoman (Wonder Woman, Kill Bill: Volume 2) (b. 1941)
  - Horace Locklear, 81, politician, member of the North Carolina House of Representatives (1977–1982) (b. 1942)
  - David Shapiro, 77, poet, literary critic, and art historian (b. 1947)
  - Gloria Stroock, 99, actress (Fun with Dick and Jane, The Competition, Uncommon Valor) (b. 1924)
- May 6
  - Joe Collier, 91, football coach (Buffalo Bills, Denver Broncos) (b. 1932)
  - Judy Devlin, 88, Canadian-born Hall of Fame badminton player (b. 1935)
  - Kevin Hardy, 78, football player (San Diego Chargers, San Francisco 49ers, Green Bay Packers) (b. 1945)
  - Bill Holman, 96, jazz composer and saxophonist (b. 1927) (death announced on this date)
  - Wayland Holyfield, 82, songwriter ("Arkansas (You Run Deep in Me)", "Rednecks, White Socks and Blue Ribbon Beer", "You're My Best Friend") (b. 1942)
  - Hootie Ingram, 90, football player (Alabama Crimson Tide), coach (Clemson Tigers), and athletic director (Florida State Seminoles) (b. 1933)
  - Robert Logan Jr., 82, actor (77 Sunset Strip, The Bridge at Remagen, The Adventures of the Wilderness Family) (b. 1941)
  - Don Penny, 91, actor (12 O'Clock High, The Wackiest Ship in the Army, The Lieutenant) and comedian (b. 1933)
  - Andy Stoglin, 81, basketball coach (Southern Jaguars, Jackson State Tigers) (b. 1942)
- May 7
  - Steve Albini, 61, musician (Big Black, Shellac) and record producer (In Utero) (b. 1962)
  - Paul Parkman, 91, physician (b. 1932)
  - Barbara Stauffacher Solomon, 95, landscape architect and graphic designer (b. 1928)
  - Phil Wiggins, 69, blues musician (Cephas & Wiggins) (b. 1954)
- May 8
  - John Barbata, 79, rock drummer (The Turtles, Jefferson Airplane, Jefferson Starship) (b. 1945)
  - Colleen Barrett, 79, airline executive, president of Southwest Airlines (2001–2008) (b. 1944)
  - Chris Cannon, 73, politician, member of the U.S. House of Representatives (1997–2009) (b. 1950)
  - Art Jimmerson, 60, boxer and mixed martial artist (b. 1963)
  - Jimmy Johnson, 86, Hall of Fame football player (San Francisco 49ers) (b. 1938)
  - Carolyn J. Krysiak, 84, politician, member of the Maryland House of Delegates (1991–2011) (b. 1939)
  - Pete McCloskey, 96, politician, member of the U.S. House of Representatives (1967–1983) (b. 1927)
  - Jack Quinn, 74, lawyer, White House counsel (1995–1997) (b. 1949)
  - Frank P. Simoneaux, 90, politician, member of the Louisiana House of Representatives (1972–1982) (b. 1933)
  - Dennis Thompson, 75, Hall of Fame drummer (MC5) (b. 1948)
- May 9
  - Barry Axelrod, 77, sports agent (b. 1946)
  - Sean Burroughs, 43, baseball player (San Diego Padres, Tampa Bay Devil Rays, Arizona Diamondbacks), Olympic champion (2000) (b. 1980)
  - Roger Corman, 98, filmmaker (The Little Shop of Horrors, Death Race 2000, The St. Valentine's Day Massacre) (b. 1926)
  - James Gregory, 78, comedian (b. 1946)
  - Nonny Hogrogian, 92, writer and illustrator (Always Room for One More, Cool Cat, One Fine Day) (b. 1932)
  - Bobby Hooper, 77, basketball player (Dayton Flyers, Indiana Pacers) (b. 1946)
  - Buzz Stephen, 79, baseball player (Minnesota Twins) (b. 1944)
  - Jon Urbanchek, 87, Hungarian-born Hall of Fame swimming coach (University of Michigan, five Olympic teams) (b. 1936)
- May 10
  - Bob Bruggers, 80, football player (Miami Dolphins, San Diego Chargers) and professional wrestler (b. 1944)
  - Christopher Edley Jr., 71, legal scholar (b. 1953)
  - Bruce Maccabee, 82, physicist and ufologist (b. 1942)
  - Tom Marshall, 93, basketball player (Western Kentucky Hilltoppers, Rochester Royals, Detroit Pistons) (b. 1931)
  - Sam Rubin, 64, television reporter (KTLA) (b. 1960)
  - Jim Simons, 86, mathematician (Simons' formula, Chern-Simons form), and hedge fund manager, founder of Renaissance Technologies (b. 1936)
  - Corey Williams, 46, basketball player (Dakota Wizards, Townsville Crocodiles, Melbourne United) (b. 1977)
- May 11
  - Susan Backlinie, 77, actress (Jaws, Day of the Animals, 1941) (b. 1946)
  - Terry Blair, 62, convicted serial killer (b. 1961)
  - Kevin Brophy, 70, actor (Lucan, The Long Riders, Hell Night) (b. 1953)
  - Peter C. Eagler, 69, politician, member of the New Jersey General Assembly (2002–2006) (b. 1954)
  - Mary Wells Lawrence, 95, advertising executive (b. 1928)
  - Dave Pivec, 80, football player (Los Angeles Rams, Denver Broncos) (b. 1943)
  - Richard Slayman, 62, patient (b. 1961/1962)
  - Jasper White, 69, chef, restaurateur and cookbook author (b. 1954)
  - John A. Wickham Jr., 95, military officer, chief of staff (1983–1987) (b. 1928)
- May 12
  - Cuno Barragan, 91, baseball player (Chicago Cubs) (b. 1932)
  - Mark Damon, 91, actor (House of Usher, Ringo and His Golden Pistol) and film producer (Monster) (b. 1933)
  - David Sanborn, 78, saxophonist (Young Americans) and Grammy winner (1981, 1986, 1988) (b. 1945)
  - A. J. Smith, 75, football player, coach and executive (b. 1949)
- May 13
  - Joseph G. Di Pinto, 92, politician, member of the Delaware House of Representatives (1987–2006) (b. 1932)
  - Albert C. Jones, 79, politician, member of the New Hampshire House of Representatives (1972–1976) (b. 1944)
  - Josef Michl, 85, Czech-born chemist, Schrödinger Medal and James Flack Norris Award recipient (b. 1939)
  - Joseph E. Potter, sociologist.
  - Clarence Sasser, 76, soldier, Medal of Honor recipient (b. 1947)
  - Cyril Wecht, 93, forensic pathologist (b. 1931)
  - Samm-Art Williams, 78, actor (The Wanderers, Dressed to Kill), playwright (Home) and television producer (The Fresh Prince of Bel-Air) (b. 1946)
- May 14
  - Don Perlin, 94, comic book artist (Werewolf by Night, Moon Knight) (b. 1929)
  - Tony Windis, 91, basketball player (Detroit Pistons) (b. 1933)
- May 15
  - Barbra Fuller, 102, actress (Adventures of Superman, Four Star Playhouse, My Three Sons) (b. 1921)
  - Tates Locke, 87, basketball coach (Clemson Tigers, Jacksonville Dolphins, Indiana State Sycamores) (b. 1937)
  - Bob McCreadie, 73, racing driver (Super DIRTcar Series) (b. 1951)
  - Joe Zucker, 83, artist (b. 1941)
- May 16
  - Dabney Coleman, 92, actor (9 to 5, WarGames, Tootsie), Emmy winner (1987) (b. 1932)
  - Randy Fuller, 80, singer, songwriter and bass guitarist (The Bobby Fuller Four) (b. 1944)
  - Ken Gardner, 74, basketball player (Utah Utes, Utah Stars)(b. 1949)
  - Eddie Gossage, 65, motorsports executive, president of Texas Motor Speedway (b. 1958)
- May 17
  - Bud Anderson, 102, fighter pilot (b. 1922)
  - Gordon Bell, 89, electrical engineer (Bell's law of computer classes) (b. 1934)
  - Peter Bennett, 57, animator (SpongeBob SquarePants, ChalkZone) (b. 1967)
  - James Hubbell, 92, visual artist (b. 1931)
  - Schuyler Jones, 94, archaeologist and anthropologist (b. 1930)
  - Bette Nash, 88, flight attendant and Guinness World Record holder (b. 1935)
  - Benny Petrus, 67, politician, member of the Arkansas House of Representatives (2007–2012) (b. 1956)
  - Gene E. K. Pratter, 75, jurist, judge of the U.S. District Court for the Eastern District of Pennsylvania (since 2004) (b. 1949)
  - Stephen J. Rivele, 75, screenwriter (Nixon, Ali, Copying Beethoven) (b. 1949)
- May 18
  - Peter Buxtun, 86, Czech-born whistleblower (b. 1937)
  - Geane Herrera, 33, mixed martial artist (b. 1990)
  - John Koerner, 85, songwriter and guitarist (Koerner, Ray & Glover) (b. 1938)
  - Jerrold Northrop Moore, 90, musicologist (b. 1934)
  - Bruce Nordstrom, 90, retail executive, chairman of Nordstrom (1968–1995, 2000–2006) (b. 1933)
  - George Papageorgiou, 68, college football player (Washington Huskies) and coach (Bethel Threshers, Benedictine Ravens) (b. 1956)
  - Fred Roos, 89, film producer (The Godfather Part II, Apocalypse Now, Rumble Fish) (b. 1934)
  - Jerald D. Slack, 88, major general (b. 1936)
  - Alice Stewart, 58, political commentator (CNN) (b. 1966)
  - Guy R. Strong, 93, college basketball player and coach (Kentucky Wesleyan Panthers, Eastern Kentucky Colonels, Oklahoma State Cowboys) (b. 1930)
  - Mark Wells, 66, ice hockey player, Olympic champion (1980) (b. 1957)
  - Harrison White, 94, sociologist (b. 1930)
  - Jon Wysocki, 53, rock drummer (Staind) (b. 1970/1971)
- May 19
  - Marshall Allen, 52, journalist (Las Vegas Sun, ProPublica) (b. 1972)
  - Larry Bensky, 87, journalist and radio host (b. 1937)
  - Peggi Blu, 77, singer and vocal coach (b. 1946/1947)
  - James L. Greenfield, 99, journalist, government official, Assistant Secretary of State for Public Affairs (1964–1966) (b. 1924)
  - Richard Foronjy, 86, actor (Serpico, Midnight Run, Carlito's Way) (b. 1937)
  - Jim Otto, 86, Hall of Fame football player (Oakland Raiders) (b. 1938)
- May 20
  - Ivan Boesky, 87, stock trader and convicted felon (b. 1937)
  - Sam Butcher, 85, artist (b. 1939)
  - Thomas W. Long, 94, politician, member of the New Jersey General Assembly (1983–1986) (b. 1929)
  - Gary Okihiro, 79, academic (b. 1945)
  - Frank Yandrisevits, 69, politician, member of the Pennsylvania House of Representatives (1985–1990, 1993–1994) (b. 1954)
- May 21
  - Richard Ellis, 86, marine biologist (b. 1938)
  - Stanley P. Goldstein, 89, businessman, co-founder of CVS Health (b. 1934)
  - Danny Wells, 84, politician, member of the West Virginia House of Delegates (2005–2014) (b. 1940)
- May 22
  - Charlie Colin, 58, bassist and guitarist (Train, The Side Deal) (b. 1966) (death announced on this date)
  - Bob Grant, 77, football player (Baltimore Colts, Washington Redskins) (b. 1946)
  - L. Martin Griffin, 103, environmentalist (b. 1920)
  - Darryl Hickman, 92, actor (The Grapes of Wrath, Network, Challenge of the GoBots) (b. 1931)
- May 23
  - Caleb Carr, 68, author (The Alienist, The Angel of Darkness, The Italian Secretary) (b. 1955)
  - Alan B. Handler, 92, judge, justice of the New Jersey Supreme Court (1977–1999) (b. 1931)
  - Morgan Spurlock, 53, filmmaker (Super Size Me, Where in the World Is Osama bin Laden?, Comic-Con Episode IV: A Fan's Hope) (b. 1970)
- May 24
  - George William Coleman, 85, Roman Catholic prelate, bishop of Fall River (2003–2014) (b. 1939)
  - Mark Gormley, 67, singer-songwriter (b. 1957)
  - Doug Ingle, 78, musician (Iron Butterfly) and songwriter ("In-A-Gadda-Da-Vida") (b. 1945)
- May 25
  - Mike Cotten, 84, college football player (Texas Longhorns) (b. 1939)
  - Richard Mazza, 84, politician, member of the Vermont Senate (1985–2024) and House of Representatives (1973–1977) (b. 1939)
  - Grayson Murray, 30, golfer, two-time PGA Tour winner (b. 1993)
  - Peter Rosenthal, 82, mathematician, lawyer, and activist (b. 1941)
  - Albert S. Ruddy, 94, Canadian-born film and television producer (The Godfather, Hogan's Heroes, Million Dollar Baby), Oscar winner (1973, 2005) (b. 1930)
  - Richard M. Sherman, 95, film songwriter (Mary Poppins, The Jungle Book, Chitty Chitty Bang Bang), Oscar winner (1965) (b. 1928)
  - Sanford L. Smith, 84, businessman, founder of the Outsider Art Fair (b. 1939)
  - Johnny Wactor, 37, actor (General Hospital, Siberia, USS Indianapolis: Men of Courage) (b. 1986)
- May 26
  - Chip Kell, 75, Hall of Fame football player (Tennessee Volunteers, Edmonton Eskimos) (b. 1949)
  - Tony Scott, 72, baseball player (Montreal Expos, St. Louis Cardinals, Houston Astros) (b. 1951)
  - Joe Sims, 55, football player (Atlanta Falcons, Green Bay Packers, Philadelphia Eagles) (b. 1969)
- May 27
  - Orlando J. George Jr., 79, academic administrator and politician (b. 1945)
  - Elizabeth MacRae, 88, actress (General Hospital, Gomer Pyle, U.S.M.C., The Conversation) (b. 1936)
  - Butch Johnson, 68, archer, Olympic champion (1996) and bronze medalist (2000) (b. 1955) (death announced on this date)
  - Bill Walton, 71, Hall of Fame basketball player (Portland Trail Blazers, Boston Celtics), NBA champion (1977, 1986) (b. 1952)
- May 28
  - Elinor Fuchs, 91, theatre scholar and critic.
  - Hub Reed, 89, basketball player (Detroit Pistons, Los Angeles Lakers, Cincinnati Royals) (b. 1934)
  - Jac Venza, 97, television producer (NET Playhouse, Great Performances) (b. 1926)
- May 29
  - Larry Cannon, 77, basketball player (Denver Rockets, Philadelphia 76ers) (b. 1947)
  - Bishop Harris, 82, football coach (North Carolina Central) (b. 1941)
  - Larry R. Hicks, 80, jurist, judge of the U.S. District Court for Nevada (since 2001) (b. 1943)
  - Dorothy Ross, 87, historian (b. 1936) (death announced on this date)
- May 30
  - Mitchell Block, 73, film producer (Big Mama, Poster Girl, The Testimony, Women of the Gulag) (b. 1950)
  - Doug Dagger, 56, punk rock singer (The Generators) (b. 1967)
  - Drew Gordon, 33, basketball player (Philadelphia 76ers) (b. 1990)
- May 31
  - Ronald A. Edmonds, 77, photojournalist, Pulitzer Prize winner (1982) (b. 1946)
  - John G. Hutchinson, 89, politician, member of the U.S. House of Representatives (1980–1981) (b. 1935)
  - Marian Robinson, 86, secretary, mother of Michelle Obama (b. 1937)
  - Martin Starger, 92, entertainment executive (ABC Entertainment) and film and television producer (Sophie's Choice, Mask) (b. 1932)

== June ==
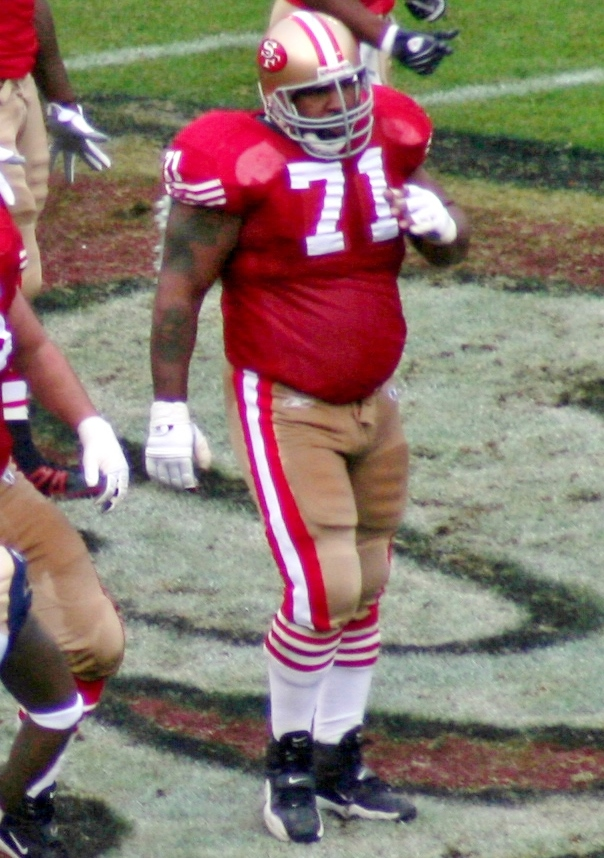
Larry Allen

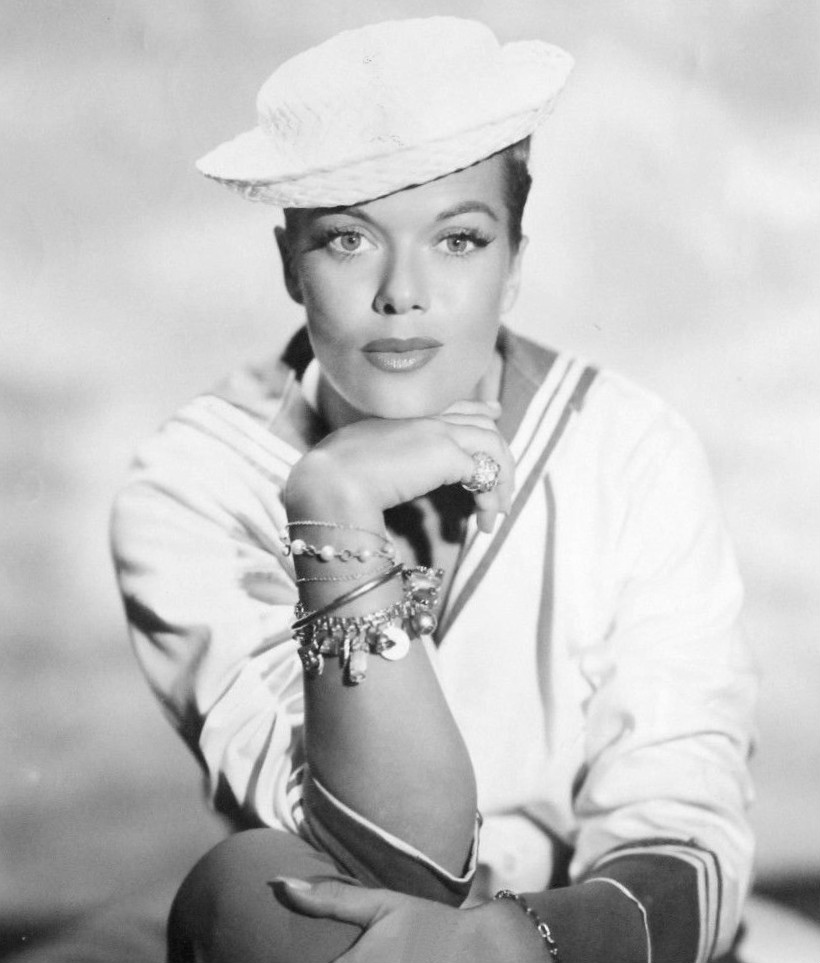
Janis Paige

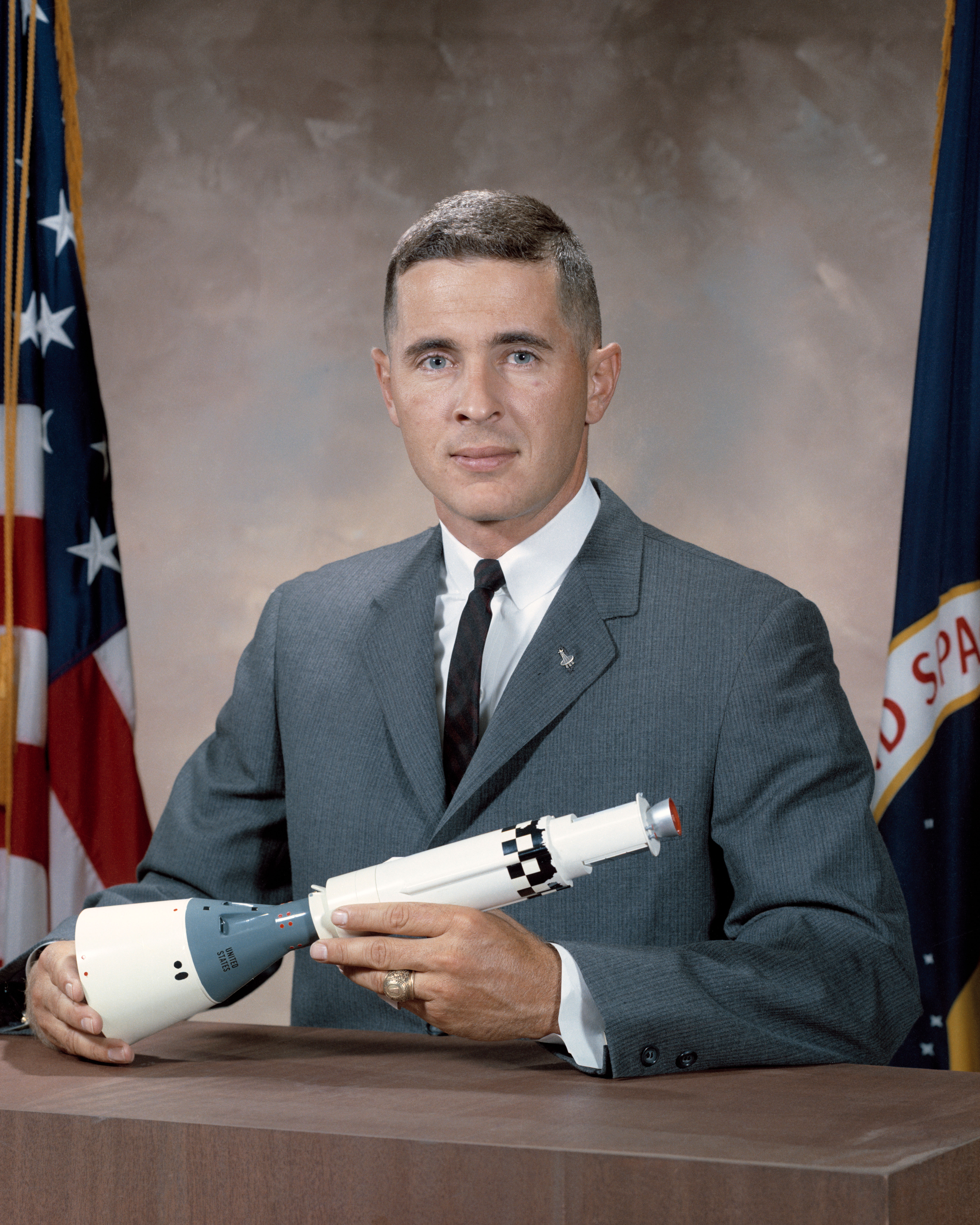
William Anders

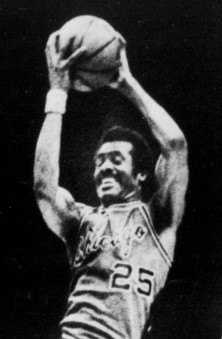
Chet Walker

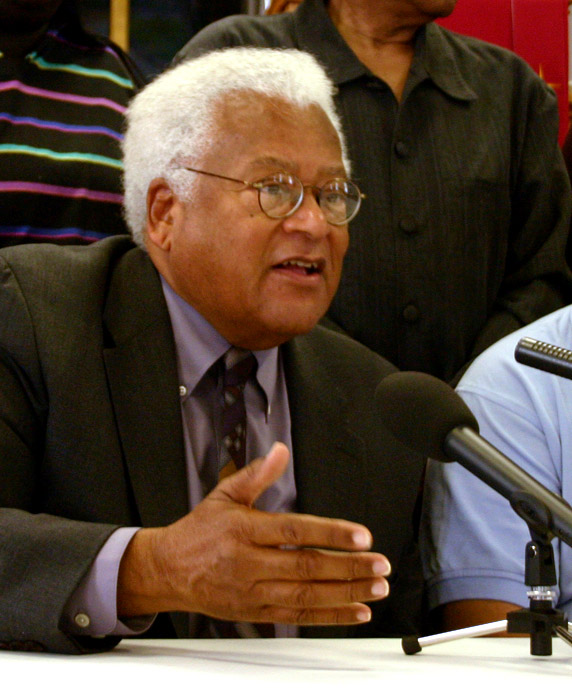
James Lawson

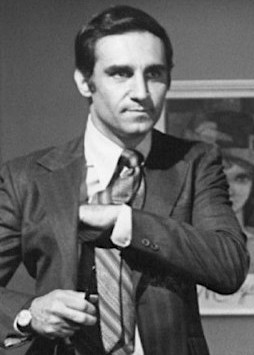
Tony Lo Bianco

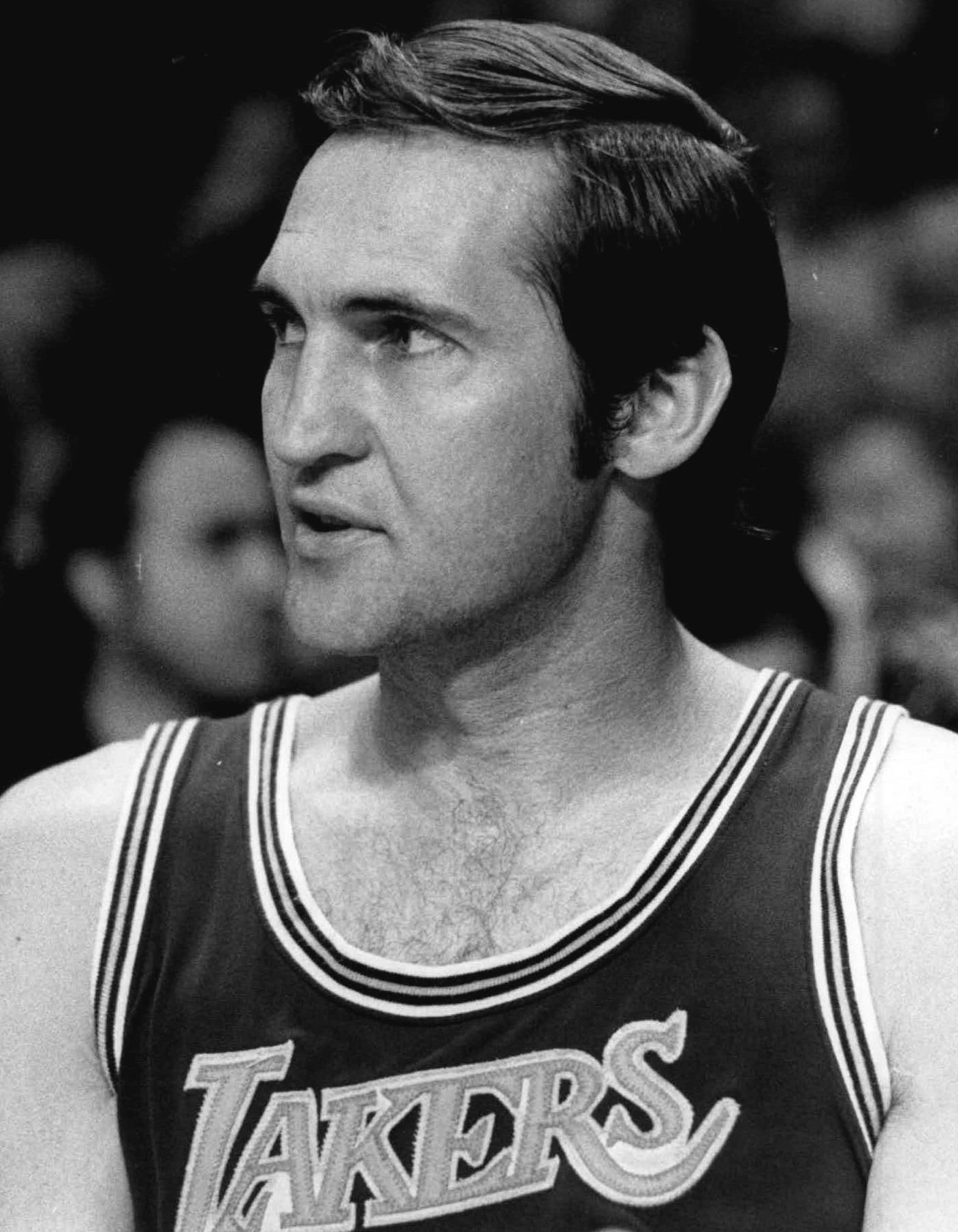
Jerry West

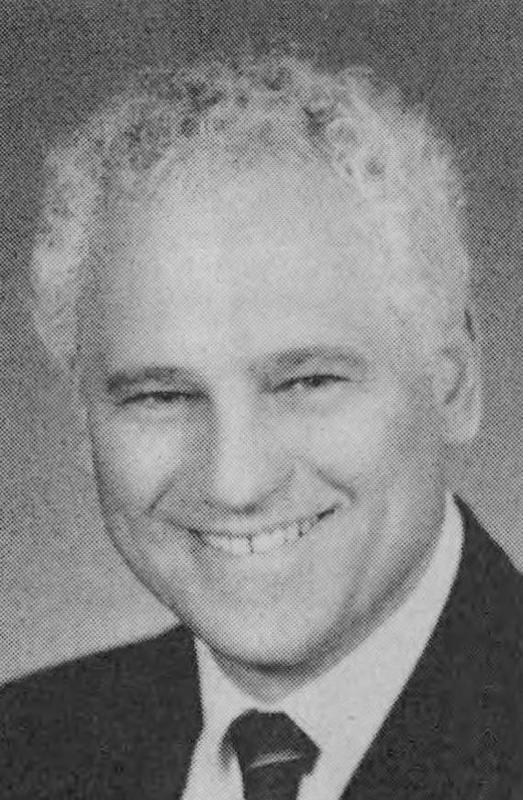
Neil Goldschmidt

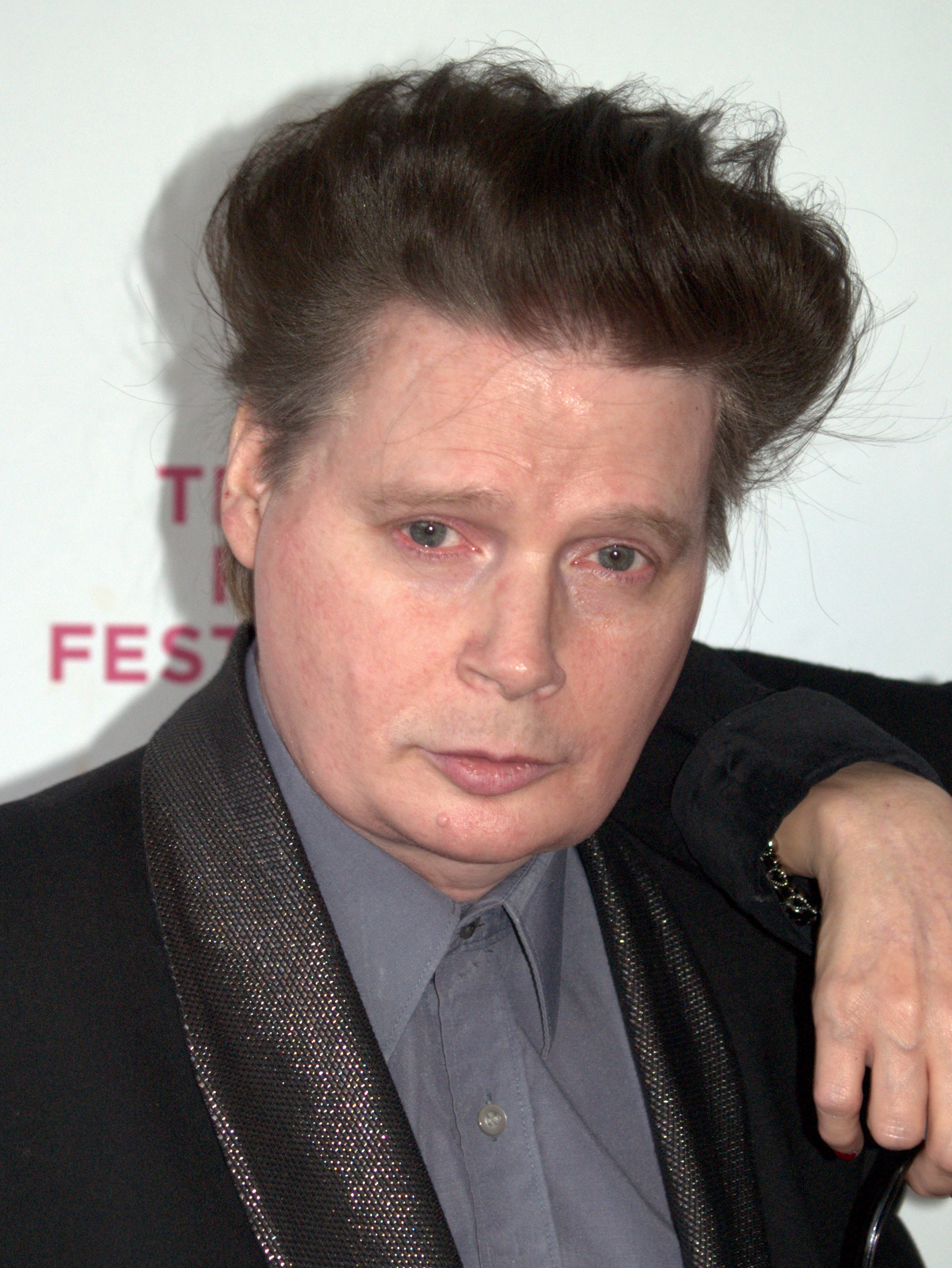
James Chance

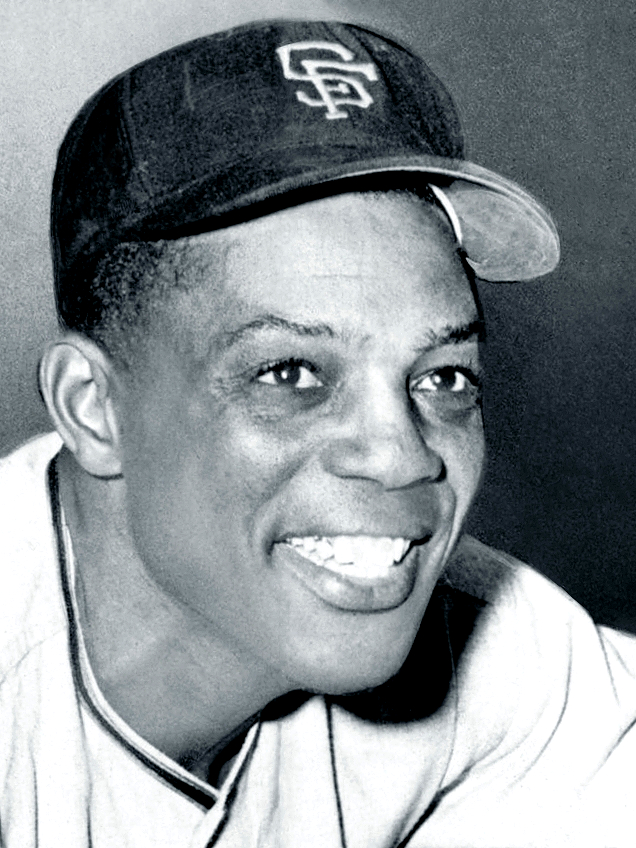
Willie Mays

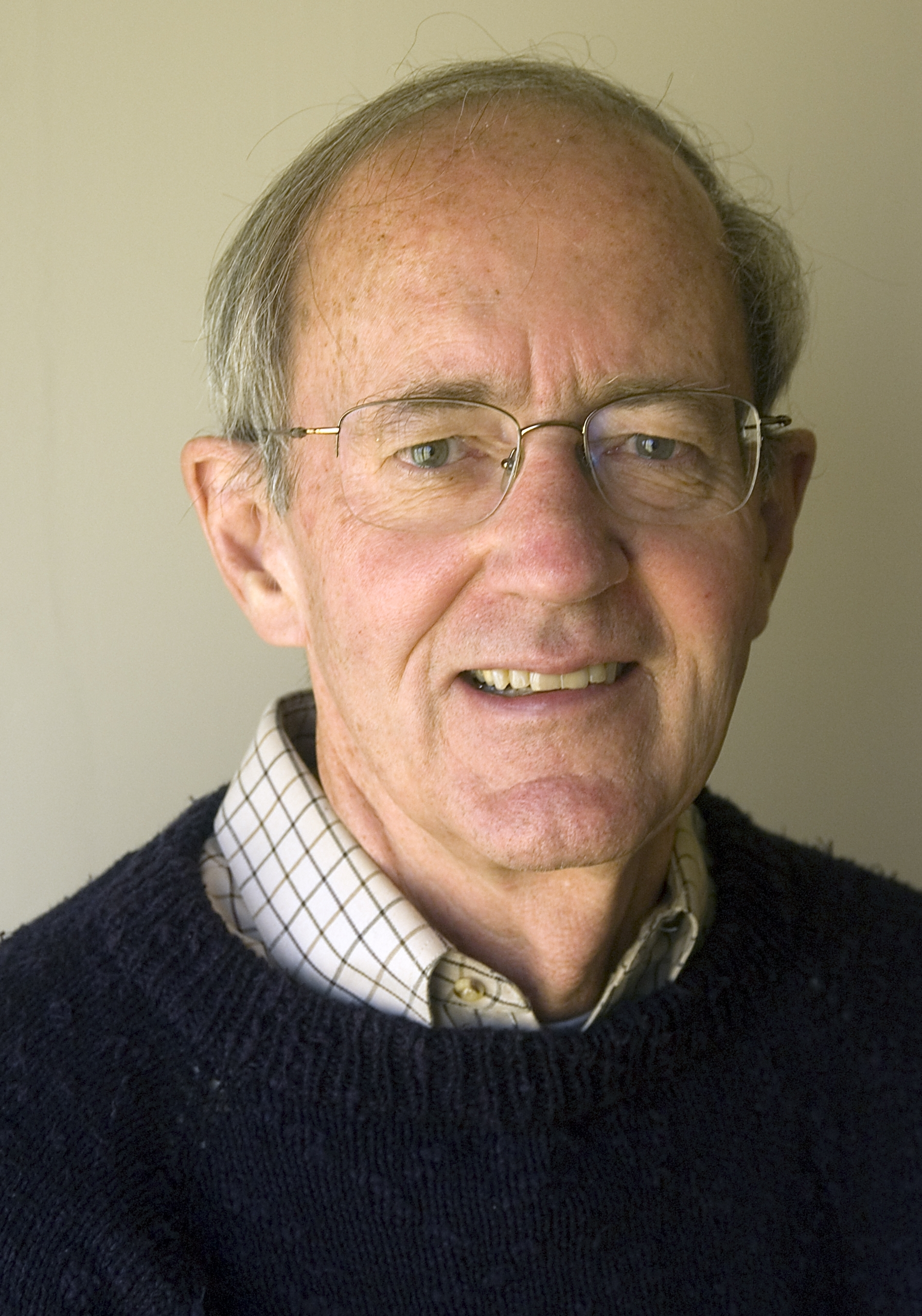
Frederick Crews

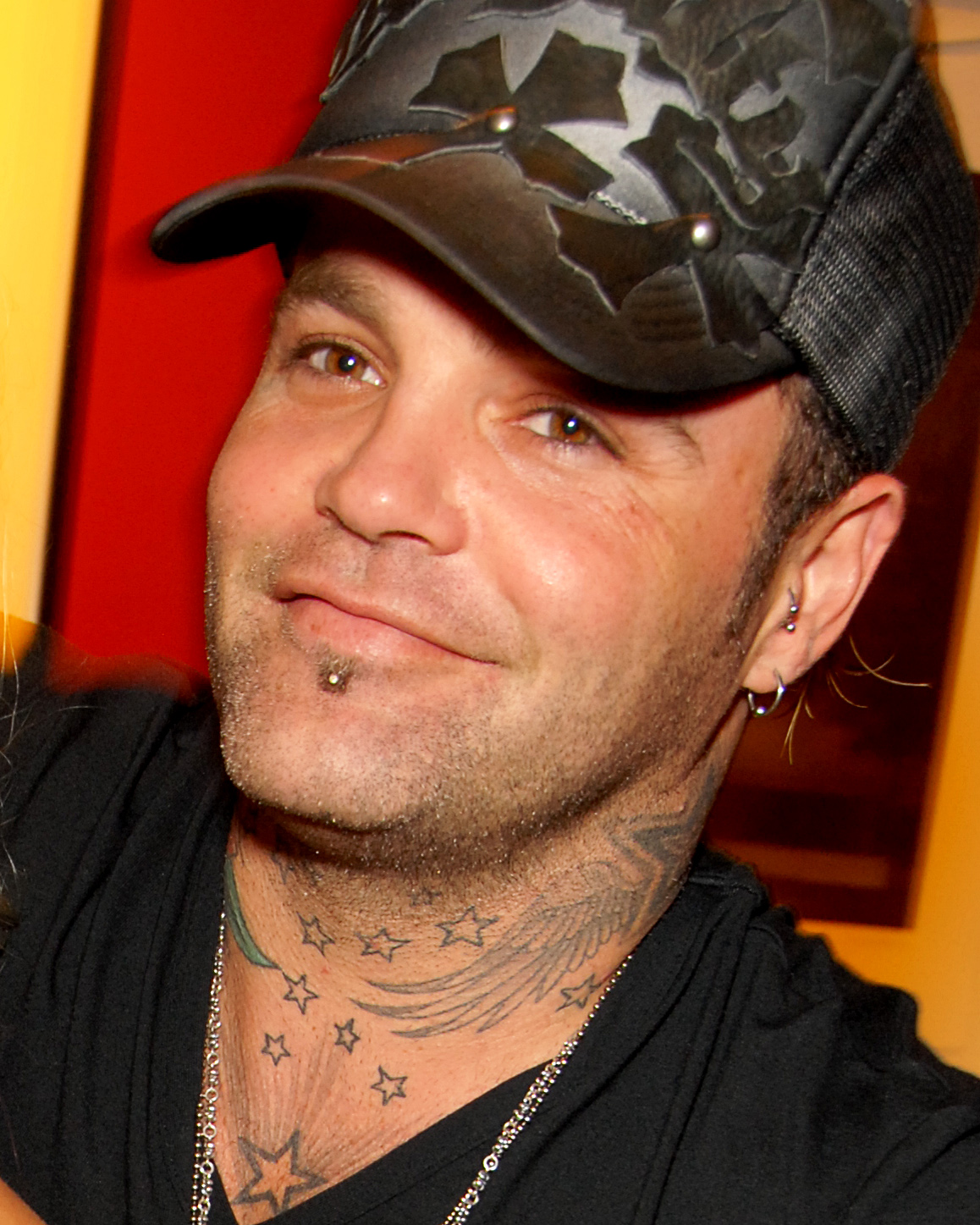
Shifty Shellshock

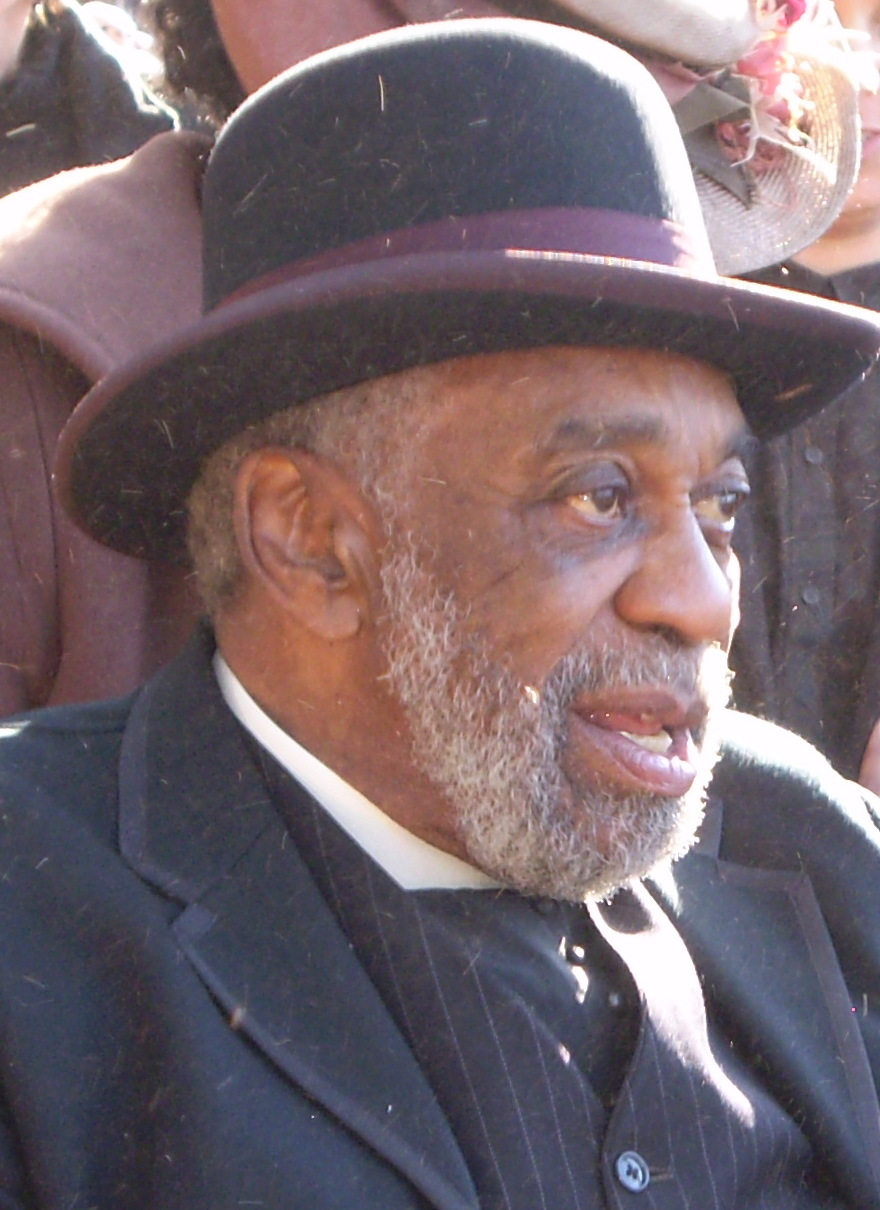
Bill Cobbs

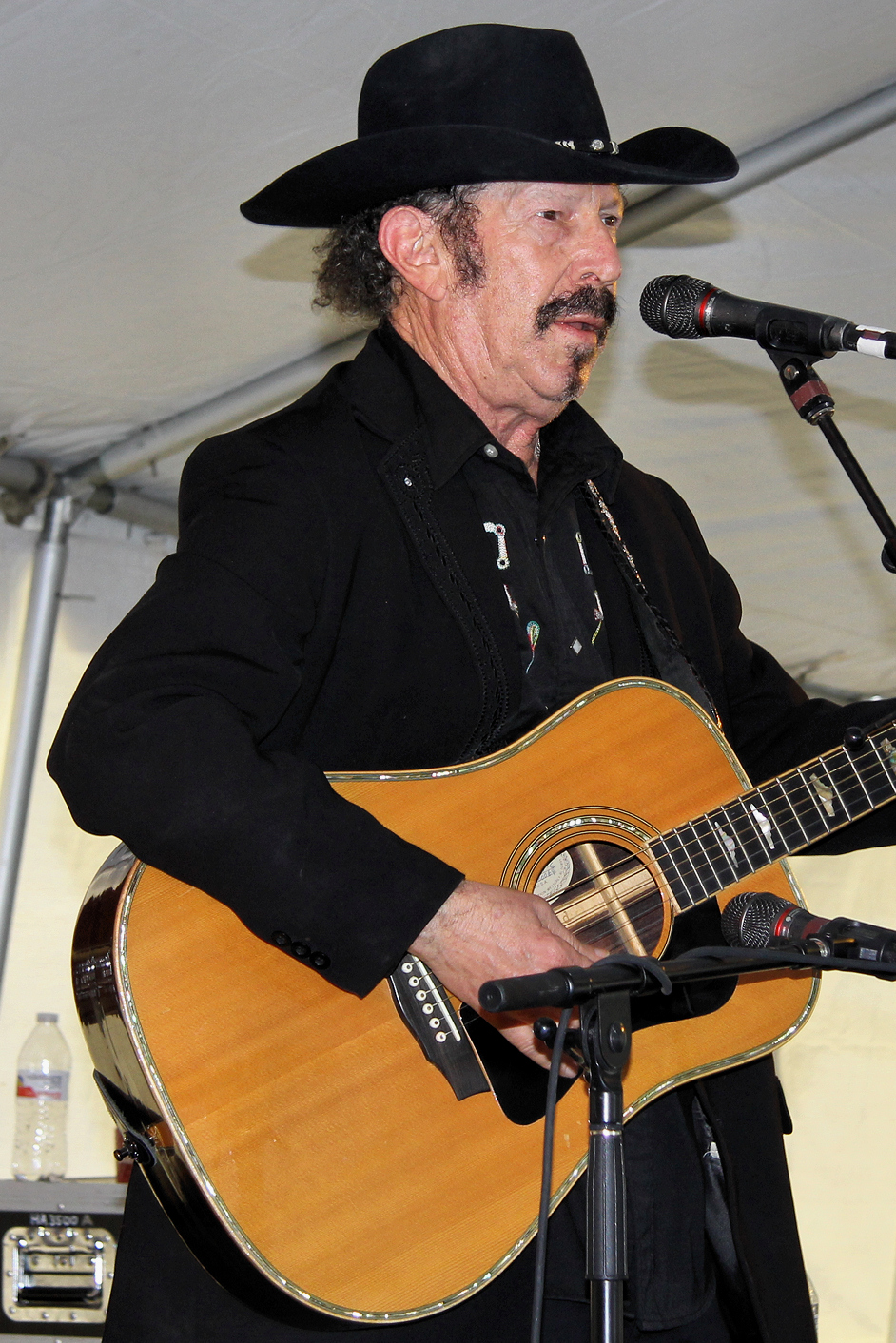
Kinky Friedman

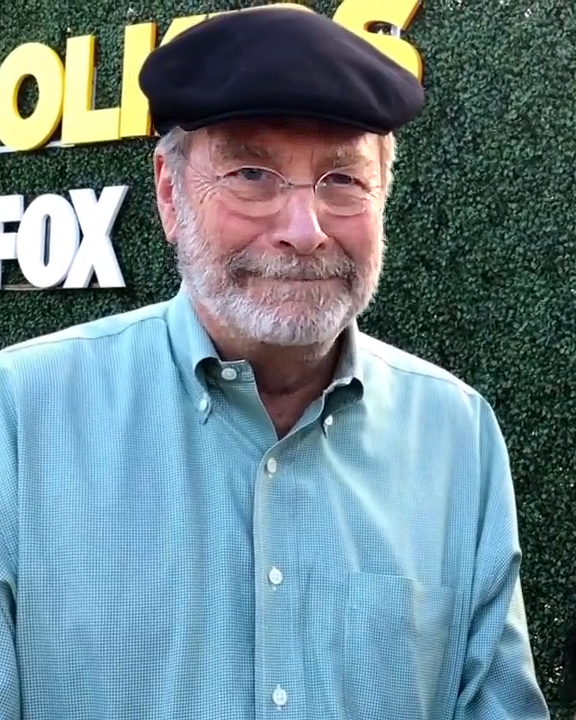
Martin Mull

- June 1
  - Erich Anderson, 67, actor (Friday the 13th: The Final Chapter, Thirtysomething, Felicity) (b. 1956)
  - Mary-Lou Pardue, 90, geneticist and academic (b. 1933)
  - Dick Sears, 81, politician, member of the Vermont Senate (since 1993) (b. 1943)
  - Roman Verostko, 94, artist and academic (b. 1929)
  - Ben White, 52, finance journalist (CNBC) (b. 1971/1972)
- June 2
  - Larry Allen, 52, Hall of Fame football player (Dallas Cowboys, San Francisco 49ers) (b. 1971)
  - Carl Cain, 89, basketball player, Olympic champion (1956) (b. 1934)
  - Emma Lou Diemer, 96, composer (b. 1927)
  - Duane Klueh, 98, basketball player (Denver Nuggets, Fort Wayne Pistons, Indiana State Sycamores) (b. 1926) (death announced on this date)
  - Janis Paige, 101, actress (Please Don't Eat the Daisies, The Pajama Game, It's Always Jan) (b. 1922)
  - T. J. Simers, 73, sports columnist (Los Angeles Times, Orange County Register) (b. 1950)
- June 3
  - Brother Marquis, 58, rapper (2 Live Crew) (b. 1966)
  - Morrie Markoff, 110, blogger, writer, and supercentenarian (b. 1914)
  - Betty Anne Rees, 81, actress (Unholy Rollers, Sugar Hill) (b. 1943)
  - Remo Saraceni, 89, Italian-born toy inventor (Walking Piano) (b. 1935)
  - Armando Silvestre, 98, actor (Rossana, The Miracle Roses, Night of the Bloody Apes) (b. 1926)
- June 4
  - Daniel T. Eismann, 77, jurist, justice (2001–2017) and chief justice (2007–2011) of the Idaho Supreme Court (b. 1947)
  - Parnelli Jones, 90, Hall of Fame racing driver and team owner (Vel's Parnelli Jones Racing), 1963 Indianapolis 500 winner (b. 1933)
  - Moshe Kotlarsky, 74, Orthodox rabbi (b. 1949)
  - Marvin Upshaw, 77, football player (Kansas City Chiefs, Cleveland Browns, St. Louis Cardinals) (b. 1946)
- June 5
  - Fred Dallmayr, 95, philosopher (b. 1928)
  - Doug Porter, 94, college football coach (Mississippi Valley State, Fort Valley State) (b. 1929)
  - Peter C. Knudson, 86, politician, member of the Utah Senate (1993–2019) (b. 1937)
  - Rosa, 24, sea otter (b. 1999)
  - Ranch Sironi, bassist (Nebula).
  - Richard Zuschlag, 76, ambulance service executive, founder of Acadian Ambulance (b. 1948)
- June 6
  - Dan Flavin, 67, politician, member of the Louisiana House of Representatives (1996–2005) (b. 1957).
  - Stanley Sue, 80, clinical psychologist (b. 1944)
- June 7
  - William Anders, 90, astronaut (Apollo 8) (b. 1933)
  - David Boaz, 70, libertarian philosopher (b. 1953)
  - Paul Pressler, 94, politician, member of the Texas House of Representatives (1957–1959) and judge (b. 1930)
  - Warren Winiarski, 95, winemaker (b. 1928)
- June 8
  - Frank Arnold, 89, basketball coach (BYU Cougars) (b. 1934)
  - Richard B. Hetnarski, 96, Polish-born academic and translator (b. 1928)
  - Mark James, 83, songwriter ("Hooked on a Feeling", "Suspicious Minds", "Always on My Mind") (b. 1940)
  - Ben Potter, 40, Internet personality (b. 1984)
  - Chet Walker, 84, Hall of Fame basketball player (Philadelphia 76ers, Chicago Bulls), NBA champion (1967) (b. 1940)
- June 9
  - Carmen M. Amedori, 68, politician and journalist, member of the Maryland House of Delegates (1999–2004) (b. 1955)
  - Lyons Brown Jr., 87, businessman and diplomat, ambassador to Austria (2001–2005) (b. 1936)
  - William Carragan, 86, musicologist, Bruckner expert (b. 1937)
  - Frank Carroll, 85, Hall of Fame competitive skater and figure-skating coach (b. 1938)
  - Lynn Conway, 86, computer scientist (b. 1938)
  - V. Craig Jordan, 76, scientist (b. 1947)
  - James Lawson, 95, civil rights activist (b. 1928)
  - Michael Lovell, 57, academic administrator, president of Marquette University (since 2014) (b. 1967)
  - David Shrayer-Petrov, 88, Russian-born novelist and poet (b. 1936)
  - Edward C. Stone, 88, scientist and physics professor, director of NASA Jet Propulsion Laboratory (1991–2001) (b. 1936)
- June 10
  - Brad Dusek, 73, football player (Washington Redskins) (b. 1950)
  - William Goines, 87, Navy SEAL (b. 1936)
  - Nathan Hare, 91, sociologist (b. 1933)
  - Arnold Mindell, 84, author, therapist, and teacher (b. 1940)
  - Homer Rice, 97, football coach (Cincinnati Bengals) and athletic director (Georgia Tech) (b. 1927)
- June 11
  - Enchanting, 26, rapper (b. 1997)
  - Howard Fineman, 75, journalist and television commentator (NBC News) (b. 1948)
  - Ruth Stiles Gannett, 100, author (My Father's Dragon) (b. 1923).
  - Robert Hughes, 96, basketball coach (b. 1928)
  - Harry Leinenweber, 87, jurist and politician, judge of the U.S. District Court for Northern Illinois (since 1985) and member of the Illinois House of Representatives (1973–1983) (b. 1937)
  - Adam Lewis, 45, musician (Fenix TX) (b. 1978/1979) (death announced on this date)
  - Bill Ligon, 72, basketball player (Vanderbilt Commodores, Detroit Pistons) (b. 1952)
  - Tony Lo Bianco, 87, actor (The Honeymoon Killers, The French Connection, The Seven-Ups) (b. 1936)
  - Tony Mordente, 88, dancer and choreographer (West Side Story) (b. 1936)
  - Dick Rosenthal, 94, basketball player (Fort Wayne Pistons) (b. 1933)
- June 12
  - Nuel Belnap, 94, logician and philosopher (b. 1930)
  - J. Warren Cassidy, 93, politician and lobbyist, mayor of Lynn (1970–1972), NRA vice president (1986–1991) (b. 1930)
  - William H. Donaldson, 93, businessman, SEC chair (2003–2005) (b. 1931)
  - Mike Downey, 72, newspaper columnist (Chicago Tribune, Detroit Free Press, Los Angeles Times) (b. 1951)
  - Neil Goldschmidt, 83, politician, governor of Oregon (1987–1991), U.S. secretary of transportation (1979–1981) (b. 1940)
  - Bob Harris, 81, sportscaster (Duke Blue Devils) (b. 1942)
  - Ron Simons, 63, actor (27 Dresses, Night Catches Us), producer (Porgy and Bess, Jitney), Tony winner (2013) (b. 1960)
  - Jerry West, 86, Hall of Fame basketball player, coach and executive (Los Angeles Lakers), Olympic champion (1960) (b. 1938)
- June 13
  - Jonathan Axelrod, 74, screenwriter and producer (Every Little Crook and Nanny, Dave's World) (b. 1949)
  - Angela Bofill, 70, singer ("This Time I'll Be Sweeter") (b. 1954)
  - Laurence Gluck, 71, real estate investor and landlord (b. 1953)
  - Benji Gregory, 46, actor (ALF, Jumpin' Jack Flash, Once Upon a Forest) (b. 1978)
  - Sir Larry Siedentop, 88, American-born British political philosopher (b. 1936)
  - Paul Sperry, 90, lyric tenor (b. 1934)
- June 14
  - Johnny Boone, 80, marijuana farmer, leader of the Cornbread Mafia (b. 1943/1944)
  - Greg Brown, 51, basketball player (New Mexico Lobos) (b. 1972)
  - George Nethercutt, 79, politician, member of the U.S. House of Representatives (1995–2005) (b. 1944)
  - Tomás Andrés Mauro Muldoon, 85, Roman Catholic prelate, bishop of Juticalpa (1983–2012) (b. 1938)
  - Jeremy Tepper, 60, radio executive (Sirius XM) (b. 1963)
- June 15
  - Mike Brumley, 61, baseball player (Detroit Tigers, Boston Red Sox) and coach (Seattle Mariners) (b. 1963)
  - James Kent, 45, chef, Bocuse d'Or USA winner (2010) (b. 1978/1979)
  - Al Kresta, 73, broadcaster (WDEO) (b. 1951)
  - Thomas McCormack, 92, writer and publisher (b. 1932)
- June 16
  - Bruce Bastian, 76, computer scientist and LGBTQ+ philanthropist, co-founder of WordPerfect (b. 1948)
  - Evans Evans, 91, actress (Bonnie and Clyde, The Iceman Cometh, Dead Bang) (b. 1932)
  - Buzz Cason, 84, singer and songwriter ("Everlasting Love") (b. 1939)
  - Barbara Gladstone, 89, art dealer and film producer (Drawing Restraint 9) (b. 1934)
  - Bob Schul, 86, long-distance runner, Olympic champion (1964) (b. 1937)
- June 17
  - Arvind, 77, Indian-born computer scientist and professor (b. 1947)
  - Robert A. Dressler, 78, lawyer and politician, mayor of Fort Lauderdale (1982–1986) (b. 1945) (death announced on this date)
  - Pam Stephenson, 73, politician, member of the Georgia House of Representatives (2013–2020) (b. 1951)
  - Ricardo M. Urbina, 78, jurist, judge of the U.S. District Court for the District of Columbia (1981–2012) (b. 1946)
- June 18
  - Joan Brady, 84, writer (Theory of War) (b. 1939) (death announced on this date)
  - James Chance, 71, musician (James Chance and the Contortions) (b. 1953)
  - Willie Mays, 93, Hall of Fame baseball player (San Francisco Giants, New York Mets), World Series champion (1954) (b. 1931)
  - Daniel Patrick Reilly, 96, Roman Catholic prelate, bishop of Norwich (1975–1994) and Worcester (1994–2004) (b. 1928)
  - Allan Saxe, 85, political scientist, author and academic (b. 1939)
  - Anthea Sylbert, 84, costume designer (Rosemary's Baby, Chinatown, Julia) (b. 1939)
- June 19
  - Dave Williams, 78, football player (St. Louis Cardinals, San Diego Chargers, Southern California Sun) (b. 1945)
  - Russell Morash, 88, television producer and director (This Old House, The French Chef, The Victory Garden) (b. 1936)
- June 20
  - Peter B. Gillis, 71, comic book writer (Strikeforce: Morituri, Captain America, Doctor Strange) (b. 1952)
  - Charles S. Klabunde, 88, artist (b. 1935)
  - Taylor Wily, 56, actor (Hawaii Five-0, Forgetting Sarah Marshall, Magnum P.I.) and sumo wrestler (b. 1968)
- June 21
  - Colin G. Campbell, 88, academic administrator, president of Wesleyan University (1970–1988) (b. 1935)
  - Frederick Crews, 91, essayist and literary critic (b. 1933)
  - Romay Davis, 104, World War II veteran (b. 1919)
  - Jamie Kellner, 77, television executive (Fox, The WB, Turner) (b. 1946/1947)
  - Darren Lewis, 55, football player (Texas A&M Aggies, Chicago Bears) (b. 1968)
  - John Middendorf, 65, mountain climber (b. 1965)
- June 22
  - John A. McDougall, 77, physician and author (b. 1947)
  - Dale Planck, 53, dirt modified racing driver (b. 1970)
- June 23
  - Dennis Deer, 51, politician, member of the Cook County Board of Commissioners (since 2017) (b. 1972)
  - Julio Foolio, 26, rapper (b. 1998)
  - Walter J. Gray, 96, politician, member of the Rhode Island Senate (1991–1995) (b. 1928)
  - Joseph L. Levesque, 85, academic administrator, president of Niagara University (2000–2013) (b. 1938/1939)
  - Tamayo Perry, 49, surfer and actor (Pirates of the Caribbean: On Stranger Tides, Blue Crush) (b. 1975)
  - Bud S. Smith, 88, film editor (The Exorcist, Sorcerer, Flashdance) (b. 1934)
  - Doris Y. Wilkinson, 88, sociologist (b. 1936)
- June 24
  - Tom Kent, 69, radio personality (b. 1954/1955)
  - Ann Lurie, 79, philanthropist, co-founder of the Ann and Robert H. Lurie Foundation (b. 1944/1945)
  - Shifty Shellshock, 49, singer (Crazy Town) and songwriter ("Butterfly", "Starry Eyed Surprise") (b. 1974)
  - Joan Benedict Steiger, 96, actress (General Hospital, The Happy Hooker Goes Hollywood, The Prize Fighter) (b. 1927)
  - Rob Stone, 55, record producer, founder of Cornerstone and co-founder of The Fader (b. 1968)
- June 25
  - Sika Anoaʻi, 79, Hall of Fame professional wrestler (WWE) (b. 1945)
  - Jewel Brown, 86, jazz and blues singer (b. 1937)
  - Bill Cobbs, 90, actor (The Bodyguard, The Hudsucker Proxy, Air Bud) (b. 1934)
  - Norman Shetler, 93, American-born Austrian pianist and puppeteer (b. 1931)
- June 26
  - Carlos Cascos, 71, politician, secretary of state of Texas (2015–2017) (b. 1952)
  - Jackie Clarkson, 88, politician, member of the Louisiana House of Representatives (1994–2002) and three-times of New Orleans City Council (b. 1936)
  - Jim Connors, 77, politician, mayor of Scranton, Pennsylvania (1990–2002) (b. 1946)
  - Gary Grant, trumpeter, composer, and music producer.
  - Carolyn Richmond, 86, literary scholar and translator (b. 1938)
- June 27
  - Kinky Friedman, 79, musician, writer, and politician (b. 1944)
  - Martin Mull, 80, actor (Clue, Roseanne, Sabrina the Teenage Witch, Arrested Development), comedian, and singer-songwriter (b. 1943)
  - Yosh Uchida, 104, judo coach (San Jose State University) (b. 1920)
- June 28
  - Donna Reed Miller, 77, politician, member of the Philadelphia City Council (1996–2012) (b. 1946)
  - Lubomyr Romankiw, 93, computer scientist and researcher, IBM Fellow (1986) (b. 1931)
- June 29
  - Joan Specter, 90, politician, member of the Philadelphia City Council (1980–1996) (b. 1934)
  - Mildred T. Stahlman, 101, neonatologist and academic (b. 1922)
- June 30
  - Dorinda Connor, 77, politician, Delaware State Senator (1997–2012).
  - Bobby Grier, 91, college football player (Pittsburgh Panthers) (b. 1933)
  - Wayne Smith, 92, diplomat and author (b. 1932)
