= Deaths in May 2024 =

The following is a list of notable deaths in May 2024.

Entries for each day are listed alphabetically by surname. A typical entry lists information in the following sequence:

- Name, age, country of citizenship at birth, subsequent country of citizenship (if applicable), reason for notability, cause of death (if known), and reference.

== May 2024 ==
=== 1 ===
- Chauhdry Abdul Rashid, 83, Pakistani-born English politician, lord mayor of Birmingham (2008–2009).
- Hasna El-Bacharia, 74, Algerian musician.
- Michael Brown, 86, Canadian Olympic sprint canoer (1960, 1964).
- Chen Junwu, 97, Chinese petroleum engineer, member of the Chinese Academy of Sciences.
- Richard E. Cook, 93, American Mormon general authority, member of the Second Quorum of the Seventy (1997–2001), CFO of Perpetual Education Fund (2001–2012).
- Pierre Claver Damiba, 87, Burkinabè economist and politician, MP (1971–1974, 1978–1980).
- Michael D'Arcy, 90, Irish politician, senator (1993–1997), minister of state of fisheries (1982–1986), and three-times TD.
- Ildefonso Dell'Olmo, 67, Spanish politician and bullfighting arena president (Plaza de toros de La Malagueta), member of the Andalusian parliament (1990–1994, 1996–2008).
- Danilo Dončić, 54, Serbian football player (Valletta, Sliema Wanderers) and manager (Lokomotiv Sofia), heart attack.
- Dominique Dupuy, 93, French dancer and choreographer.
- Gary Felsenfeld, 94, American molecular biologist.
- Tibor Hollo, 96, Hungarian-born American real estate developer and Holocaust survivor.
- Erik Jayme, 89, Canadian-born German jurist.
- Abu Ahmed Zahirul Amin Khan, 79, Bangladeshi major general.
- Jacques Lepatey, 94, French rugby union player (SC Mazamet, national team).
- Miroslav Macek, 79, Czech politician and writer, MP (1990–1992).
- Richard Maloof, 84, American musician (Les Brown, Lawrence Welk).
- Terry Medwin, 91, Welsh football player (Swansea City, Tottenham Hotspur, national team) and manager.
- Ian Mellor, 74, English footballer (Manchester City, Brighton, Sheffield Wednesday), amyloidosis.
- J. George Mikelsons, 87, Latvian-American airline founder (ATA Airlines) and pilot.
- Tahnoun bin Mohammed Al Nahyan, 82, Emirati royal and politician, ruler's representative of the Al Ain Region (since 1971).
- Doyle Niemann, 77, American prosecutor, public administrator, and politician, member of the Maryland House of Delegates (2003–2015).
- Massimo Nistri, 68, Italian Olympic backstroke swimmer (1972).
- Takayasu Okushima, 85, Japanese academic and scouting administrator, president of Hakuoh University (since 2013) and chief scout of the Scout Association of Japan (since 2010), pneumonia.
- Dallas Penn, 53, American fashion designer, musician and internet personality.
- Juzefs Petkēvičs, 83, Latvian chess grandmaster.
- Victoria Prego, 75, Spanish journalist (TVE) and television presenter (Telediario).
- Uma Ramanan, 69, Indian playback singer.
- Barry Romo, 76, American antiwar activist, heart attack.
- Austin Savage, 84, Welsh Olympic field hockey player (1972).
- Joe Shipley, 88, American baseball player (San Francisco Giants, Chicago White Sox).
- Bob H. Suzuki, 88, American educator.
- Richard Tandy, 76, English Hall of Fame musician (Electric Light Orchestra, The Move).
- William Toye, 97, Canadian author and editor, co-founder of the Tamarack Review.
- Elmer Yanga, 78, Filipino sports executive (Pop Cola Panthers).

=== 2 ===
- A. J. Mohammad Ali, 73, Bangladeshi lawyer, attorney general (2005–2007).
- Derek Angus, 86, New Zealand politician, MP (1981–1990).
- Bruce Arnold, 87, English journalist and author, pneumonia.
- Josh Baker, 20, English cricketer (Worcestershire), heart defect.
- Sofia Berezanska, 99, Ukrainian archaeologist.
- Susan Buckner, 72, American actress (Grease, Deadly Blessing, The Brady Bunch Hour).
- Mary Collins, 88, American theologian.
- Nalin de Silva, 79, Sri Lankan philosopher and political analyst.
- Sjoukje Dijkstra, 82, Dutch figure skater, Olympic champion (1964).
- Earl Edwards, 78, American football player (San Francisco 49ers, Cleveland Browns, Edmonton Eskimos).
- Winfried Fockenberg, 79, German jurist and politician, MP (1990–1994).
- Miriam Forman, 85, American astrophysicist.
- Derek Forster, 75, English footballer (Sunderland, Charlton Athletic, Vancouver Royals).
- Skip Foster, 63, American football coach (Coffeyville), cancer.
- Brian Halfpenny, 87, English Anglican priest and military chaplain.
- Ian Hayden, 83, Australian footballer (Richmond).
- Miloš Herbst, 81, Czech Olympic footballer.
- Herbert J. Hoelter, 73, American criminal justice consultant and prison consultant, heart failure.
- David Konstan, 83, American classicist.
- Manca Košir, 76, Slovene journalist (Nova revija) and actress (Real Pests).
- Edgar Lansbury, 94, British-American theatre producer (The Subject Was Roses), Tony winner (1960).
- Adolpho Lindenberg, 99, Brazilian civil engineer, architect and writer.
- Derrick Lonsdale, 100, British-born American pediatrician.
- Darius Morris, 33, American basketball player (Los Angeles Lakers, Brooklyn Nets, Philadelphia 76ers), coronary artery disease.
- Ana María Navarro, 94, Spanish academic.
- Peter Oosterhuis, 75, English golfer and broadcaster (CBS Sports), complications from Alzheimer's disease.
- John Pisano, 93, American jazz guitarist.
- Lou-Ann Preble, 94, American politician, member of the Arizona House of Representatives (1993–2001).
- Adrian Prosser, 67, Canadian Olympic cyclist (1976).
- Roxanne, 95, American model and actress (The Seven Year Itch, The Young Don't Cry).
- Tito Steiner, 72, Paraguayan-Argentine Olympic decathlete (1976), pneumonia.
- Eloína Suárez, 101, Spanish politician, mayor of Oviedo (1978–1979).
- Bobby Tait, 85, Scottish footballer (Barrow, Notts County, Chesterfield).
- Werner Weinhold, 74, German deserter and convicted murderer.
- Mary Wilson, 84, Australian Olympic figure skater.

=== 3 ===
- Kazuo Aichi, 86, Japanese politician, director-general of the Defence Agency (1993–1994) and MP (1976–2000, 2005–2009), COVID-19.
- Atul Kumar Anjan, 69, Indian political activist.
- Issam al-Attar, 97, Syrian political dissident (Muslim Brotherhood).
- Tony Bleasdale, 77, English-born Australian politician, mayor of Blacktown (since 2019).
- Mayotte Bollack, 95, French academic and philologist.
- Dorothy Bromiley, 93, British actress (The Girls of Pleasure Island, It's Great to Be Young, A Touch of the Sun).
- Géraldine Carré, 54, French journalist and television presenter.
- Obi Ezeh, 36, American football player (Michigan Wolverines).
- Victor Farrant, 74, English convicted murderer and rapist, cancer.
- Roger Fortson, 23, American Air Force serviceman, shot.
- Kailash Chandra Gahtori, 55, Indian politician, Uttarakhand MLA (2017–2022).
- Paul-Henry Gendebien, 84, Belgian economist and politician, member of the Chamber of Representatives (1971–1981, 1985–1988) and MEP (1979–1984).
- László Hammerl, 82, Hungarian sport shooter, Olympic champion (1964).
- Avraham Harshalom, 99, Czech-Israeli businessman and Holocaust survivor. (death announced on this date)
- Helmut Howiller, 80, German Olympic judoka (1972).
- Moorhead C. Kennedy Jr., 93, American Foreign Service officer and hostage survivor (Iran hostage crisis).
- Imerio Massignan, 87, Italian road racing cyclist.
- Jim Mills, 57, American banjo player (Kentucky Thunder), heart attack.
- Mustafa Mkulo, 77, Tanzanian economist and politician, MP (2005–2015) and minister of finance (2007–2012).
- Terezinha Rêgo, 91, Brazilian botanist, respiratory failure.
- Jim Rodger, 90, Scottish footballer (St Mirren, Rangers, Queen of the South).
- Sum Ronghang, 61, Indian politician, Assam MLA (2016–2021), multiple organ failure.
- Dick Rutan, 85, American aviator, complications from COVID-19.
- Frank Shrontz, 92, American corporate executive, CEO of Boeing (1986–1996) and assistant secretary of defense for sustainment (1976–1977).
- Denis Trento, 41, Italian ski mountaineer, fall.
- Yashwant Trivedi, 89, Indian poet, pneumonia.
- Germain Viatte, 84, Canadian-born French art historian and museum curator.

=== 4 ===
- Bob Avellini, 70, American football player (Chicago Bears), cancer.
- Mikhail Banshchikov, 75, Russian politician, MP (2007–2011), traffic collision.
- Ignacio Bayón, 80, Spanish politician, minister of industry and energy (1980–1982).
- Derek Birdsall, 89, British graphic designer.
- Bob Clifford, 87, Australian footballer (Richmond).
- Guy Deutscher, 88, Israeli experimental physicist.
- Carder England, 36, American poker player.
- Dagoberto Fontes, 80, Uruguayan footballer (Defensor Sporting, national team).
- Gangadhar Gade, 85, Indian politician, Maharashtra MLA (1972–1978).
- Judith G. Garber, 62, American diplomat, ambassador to Latvia (2009–2012) and Cyprus (2019–2022).
- Han Zhenxiang, 93, Chinese electrical engineer and academic administrator, president of Zhejiang University (1984–1988) and member of the Chinese Academy of Sciences.
- Narcisa Hirsch, 96, German-born Argentine filmmaker.
- Foivos Ioannidis, 88, Greek lawyer and politician, MP (1989–2004).
- Jūrō Kara, 84, Japanese playwright.
- Tekin Kartal, 33–34, Turkish-German drug trafficker, shot.
- Ron Kavana, 73, Irish singer-songwriter.
- Judith Medlicott, 82, New Zealand lawyer and advocate, New Zealand Mastermind champion (1988), chancellor of the University of Otago (1993–1998).
- David Messina, 92, Italian sports journalist (Tuttosport, Gazzetta dello Sport) and television presenter (Diretta Stadio).
- Carola Miró, 58, Spanish teacher and political consort, cancer.
- Anna Panagiotopoulou, 78, Greek actress (Safe Sex, Crying... Silicon Tears, Oi Treis Harites), complications from Alzheimer's disease.
- Giusto Pellanera, 86, Italian Olympic basketball player (1964, 1968) and coach.
- Yechiel Perr, 89, American rabbi.
- Anthony Pascal Rebello, 74, Kenyan Roman Catholic prelate, bishop of Francistown (since 2021).
- Karl Ringel, 91, German footballer (Borussia Neunkirchen, Saarland national team, West Germany national team).
- Badr bin Abdul Mohsen Al Saud, 75, Saudi prince and poet.
- Alaa Shreiteh, 44, Palestinian militant, killed.
- Frank Stella, 87, American painter, sculptor, and printmaker, lymphoma.

=== 5 ===
- Belinda Bellville, 94, British fashion designer.
- Belgacem Bouguenna, 61, Tunisian singer and teacher.
- Milagros Cámere, 51, Peruvian Olympic volleyball player (1996, 2000).
- Columba Cryan, 94, Irish Gaelic footballer (Ballinamore Seán O'Heslin's).
- Fred Dewilde, 58, French comics artist, suicide.
- Jeannie Epper, 83, American stuntwoman (Romancing the Stone, Kill Bill: Volume 2, Minority Report).
- Lizzy Evoeme, 81, Nigerian actress (New Masquerade).
- Bernard Hill, 79, English actor (The Lord of the Rings, Titanic, Wolf Hall).
- Phil Hoadley, 72, English footballer (Orient, Norwich City, Crystal Palace).
- Willie Hona, 70, New Zealand Hall of Fame musician (Herbs), pancreatic cancer.
- Jose Kattukkaran, 92, Indian politician, mayor of Thrissur (2000–2004).
- Etelka Kenéz Heka, 87, Hungarian writer, poet and singer.
- Eiji Kiyokawa, 62, Japanese baseball player (Hiroshima Toyo Carp, Osaka Kintetsu Buffaloes), cancer.
- Vladimir Kuznetsov, 96, Russian archeologist and historian.
- Fernand Lalonde, 91, Canadian lawyer and politician, Quebec MNA (1973–1984).
- Frank Leeflang, 87, Surinamese jurist, diplomat, and politician, minister of justice (1982–1985).
- Horace Locklear, 81, American politician, member of the North Carolina House of Representatives (1977–1982).
- Kelath Aravindakshan Marar, 82, Indian chenda player.
- Olivier Masurel, 44, French aerobatic pilot, plane crash.
- César Luis Menotti, 85, Argentine football player (Rosario Central, national team) and manager (national team), world champion (1978), anemia.
- Isabel Miralles González, Spanish academic, road traffic accident.
- Ngoy Nsumbu, 51, Congolese footballer (Genk, Maccabi Petah Tikva, national team), complications from cancer.
- Oleksandr Pielieshenko, 30, Ukrainian Olympic weightlifter (2016) and serviceman, killed in action.
- Simona Postlerová, 59, Czech actress (The Territory of White Deer).
- Alexander Reichenberg, 31, Swedish-Norwegian ice hockey player (IK Oskarshamn, Norway national team, 2018 Olympics).
- David Shapiro, 77, American poet, literary critic, and art historian, complications from Parkinson's disease.
- Gloria Stroock, 99, American actress (Fun with Dick and Jane, The Competition, Uncommon Valor).
- Zbigniew Szałajda, 89, Polish engineer and politician.
- Robert Zawada, 79, Polish Olympic handball player (1972).

=== 6 ===
- Haerul Amri, 51, Indonesian politician, MP (since 2022), heart attack.
- Joe Collier, 91, American football coach (Buffalo Bills, Denver Broncos, New England Patriots).
- Judy Devlin, 88, Canadian-born English-American Hall of Fame badminton player, cancer.
- Bella Feldman, 94, American sculptor.
- Ian Gelder, 74, British actor (Game of Thrones, Torchwood, Little Dorrit), bile duct cancer.
- Kristin Hallenga, 38, English breast cancer awareness activist (CoppaFeel!), breast cancer.
- Kevin Hardy, 78, American football player (San Diego Chargers, San Francisco 49ers, Green Bay Packers).
- Harikumar, 68, Indian film director (Puli Varunne Puli, Jaalakam, Sukrutham), cancer.
- Steve Harney, 73, English footballer (Bradford City, Guiseley).
- Bill Holman, 96, American jazz composer and saxophonist.
- Wayland Holyfield, 82, American songwriter ("Arkansas (You Run Deep in Me)", "Rednecks, White Socks and Blue Ribbon Beer", "You're My Best Friend").
- Hootie Ingram, 90, American football player (Alabama Crimson Tide), coach (Clemson Tigers), and athletic director (Florida State Seminoles).
- Kanakalatha, 63, Indian actress (Pookkaalam, Aakasha Ganga 2, Spadikam), complications from dementia.
- Marie A. Kelleher, 53, American medieval scholar.
- Rudolf Keszthelyi, 89, Hungarian Olympic gymnast (1960).
- Susanna Kubelka, 81, Austrian-born French writer.
- Takaharu Kyōgoku, 86, Japanese Shinto priest, chief priest of Yasukuni Shrine (2008–2013), epidural hematoma.
- Robert Logan Jr., 82, American actor (77 Sunset Strip, A Night in Heaven, The Adventures of the Wilderness Family).
- Mike Nugent, 77, Australian athlete and wheelchair manufacturer, Paralympic champion (1980, 1984).
- Tony Parkes, 74, American folk dancer and choreographer.
- Don Penny, 91, American actor (12 O'Clock High, The Wackiest Ship in the Army, The Lieutenant) and comedian.
- Heinrich Pfusterschmid-Hardtenstein, 97, Austrian diplomat.
- Bernard Pivot, 89, French journalist (Le Figaro) and talk show host (Apostrophes, Bouillon de culture), chairman of the Académie Goncourt (2014–2020), cancer.
- Petya Stavreva, 47, Bulgarian journalist and politician, MEP (2007–2009), MP (since 2023).
- Christiane Stefanski, 74, Belgian singer.
- Andy Stoglin, 81, American basketball coach (Southern Jaguars, Jackson State Tigers).
- André Trigano, 98, French camping industry executive and politician, mayor of Pamiers (1995–2020).
- Johnnie Walker, 79, Australian racing driver (Australian Formula 2, Formula 5000).
- Brian Wenzel, 94, Australian actor (A Country Practice, Rove, The Odd Angry Shot).

=== 7 ===
- Evald Aavik, 83, Estonian actor (Nest of Winds, Arvo Iho, Somnambuul).
- Steve Albini, 61, American musician (Big Black, Shellac) and record producer (In Utero), heart attack.
- Isabelle Becker, 59, French singer.
- Salam Bin Razzaq, 83, Indian writer and translator.
- Martin Cearns, 79, English football executive, chairman of West Ham United (1990–1992).
- John Charles, 83, New Zealand film composer (Goodbye Pork Pie, Utu, The Quiet Earth), conductor, and orchestrator.
- Basit Ahmed Dar, 22, Indian Kashmiri militant commander (TRF).
- Jim Flegg, 87, British horticulturalist and broadcaster.
- Thurley Fowler, 99, Australian author.
- Fabio Gallia, 60, Italian banker, CEO of BNP Paribas (2008–2015).
- Neil Grant, 85, New Zealand potter.
- Paul Holmes, 56, English footballer (Torquay United, Everton, West Bromwich Albion), cancer.
- Ronald Alan Hurst, 94, American politician, member of the Illinois House of Representatives (1965–1967).
- Jan Helge Jansen, 86, Norwegian politician, MP (1981–1985).
- Ignatius Jones, 66–67, Australian-Filipino singer (Jimmy and the Boys, Pardon Me Boys) and journalist.
- Agustín Juárez, 80, Mexican Olympic cyclist.
- Kim Ki-nam, 94, North Korean politician, director of the Propaganda and Agitation Department of the Workers' Party of Korea (1989–2017), multiple organ failure.
- Leo Kogeldans, 93, Surinamese footballer (VVV-Venlo, national team).
- Antonio Mentor, 74, Brazilian businessman and politician, São Paulo MLA (1999–2015).
- Reid Morden, 82, Canadian diplomat and civil servant, director of the Canadian Security Intelligence Service (1988–1992).
- Paul Parkman, 91, American physician, lymphoblastic leukemia.
- Joan Rigol, 81, Spanish politician, president of the parliament of Catalonia (1999–2003), Catalan minister of employment (1980–1984) and culture (1984–1985).
- John Smaligo, 83, American politician.
- Barbara Stauffacher Solomon, 95, American landscape architect and graphic designer.
- Phil Wiggins, 69, American blues musician (Cephas & Wiggins), cancer.
- Jan Ptaszyn Wróblewski, 88, Polish jazz musician, composer and arranger.

=== 8 ===
- Ifigeneia Asteriadi, 57, Greek actress, cancer.
- K. Vasantha Bangera, 78, Indian politician, Karnataka MLA (1983–1989, 1994–1999, 2008–2018).
- John Barbata, 79, American rock drummer (The Turtles, Jefferson Airplane, Jefferson Starship).
- Colleen Barrett, 79, American airline executive, president of Southwest Airlines (2001–2008).
- Saudade Braga, 75, Brazilian politician, mayor of Nova Friburgo (2001–2008).
- Viv Busby, 74, English football player (Luton Town, Fulham) and manager (Hartlepool United).
- Chris Cannon, 73, American politician, member of the U.S. House of Representatives (1997–2009).
- Gérard César, 89, French politician, three-time deputy, senator (1990–2017).
- Lázaro Chiappe, 87, Argentine lawyer and politician, senator (2001–2003) and vice-governor of Corrientes Province (1993–1995).
- Graham Cooper, 83, British Olympic rower (1960).
- Jean Emelina, 90, French academic and writer.
- Grace Chijimma Ezema, 81, Nigerian electrical engineer.
- Vicente Fernández-Capel, 76, Spanish lawyer and politician, member of the Andalusian parliament (1986–1990), multiple contusions.
- Ramón Fonseca Mora, 71, Panamanian lawyer (Panama Papers, Operation Car Wash) and novelist, co-founder of Mossack Fonseca.
- Oleg Gudymo, 79, Transnistrian politician.
- Thomas M. Holcomb, 78, American politician, member of the Michigan House of Representatives (1975–1979).
- Art Jimmerson, 60, American boxer and mixed martial artist (UFC 1).
- Jimmy Johnson, 86, American Hall of Fame football player (San Francisco 49ers).
- Terrol Dew Johnson, 51–52, American Tohono Oʼodham basket weaver.
- Carolyn J. Krysiak, 84, American politician, member of the Maryland House of Delegates (1991–2011).
- George Lavery, 93, Northern Irish Gaelic footballer (Antrim, Down).
- Jean Lavoué, 69, French author, poet and essayist.
- Jan Lundqvist, 97, Swedish academic and geologist.
- Giovanna Marini, 87, Italian singer-songwriter.
- Pete McCloskey, 96, American politician and activist, member of the U.S. House of Representatives (1967–1983), heart and kidney failure.
- Brian Phelan, 89, Irish actor (The Criminal, Accident), dramatist and screenwriter (Little Mother).
- Jack Quinn, 74, American lawyer, White House counsel (1995–1997) and chief of staff to the vice president (1993–1995), complications from a double-lung transplant.
- Moosa Raza, 87, Indian civil servant.
- Julio Salazar, 89, Peruvian army general and convicted murderer (La Cantuta massacre), defence minister (1998–1999) and head of the national intelligence service (1991–1998).
- Frank P. Simoneaux, 90, American politician, member of the Louisiana House of Representatives (1972–1982).
- Sangeeth Sivan, 65, Indian film director (Gandharvam, Johnny, Apna Sapna Money Money) and screenwriter.
- Julia Trashlieva, 88, Bulgarian rhythmic gymnast.
- C. Velayudham, 73, Indian politician, Tamil Nadu MLA (1996–2001).
- Wang Geng, 96, Chinese scientist, member of the Chinese Academy of Sciences.
- Shirley Warren, 84, New Zealand politician.
- K. P. Yohannan, 74, Indian Christian prelate, metropolitan bishop of Believers Eastern Church (since 1993), traffic collision.

=== 9 ===
- Barry Axelrod, 77, American sports agent.
- Ibrahim Babangida, 47, Nigerian footballer (FC Volendam), traffic collision.
- Bai Yilong, 83, Chinese mechanist and academic.
- Avner Ben-Gal, 57, Israeli painter and artist.
- Colin Breed, 77, British politician, MP (1997–2010).
- Sean Burroughs, 43, American baseball player (San Diego Padres, Tampa Bay Devil Rays, Arizona Diamondbacks), Olympic champion (2000), fentanyl overdose.
- Dame Shirley Conran, 91, British writer and journalist, pneumonia.
- Roger Corman, 98, American film director (The Little Shop of Horrors, The St. Valentine's Day Massacre) and producer (Death Race 2000).
- Henri Coupon, 94, French lawyer, author and screenwriter.
- Vladimir Dorofeev, 86–87, Russian politician, deputy (1990–1993).
- Silvio Fazio, 72, Italian-French novelist.
- Gary Greaves, 88, American football player (Houston Oilers).
- James Gregory, 78, American comedian, cardiac complications.
- Rosemary Haughton, 97, British Catholic lay theologian.
- Nonny Hogrogian, 92, American writer and illustrator (Always Room for One More, Cool Cat, One Fine Day), cancer.
- Bobby Hooper, 77, American basketball player (Dayton Flyers, Indiana Pacers).
- Tozammel Tony Huq, 84, Bangladeshi-British diplomat and civil servant.
- Ivan Ivanji, 95, Serbian author.
- Akmal Lewaney, 78, Pakistani Pashto poet.
- Cam McCarthy, 29, Australian footballer (Greater Western Sydney, Fremantle).
- Yvonne Mokgoro, 73, South African jurist, judge of the Constitutional Court (1994–2009), injuries sustained in a traffic collision.
- Steve Moss, 74, American politician.
- Rex Murphy, 77, Canadian commentator and writer (National Post), cancer.
- Kurt Narvesen, 75, Norwegian poet and translator.
- Larry Polansky, 69, American composer and musician.
- Toini Pöysti, 90, Finnish cross-country skier, Olympic bronze medallist (1960, 1964).
- Raúl Sanz Jiménez, 74, Spanish businessman and politician, member of the Parliament of La Rioja (1983–1987).
- Tore Schweder, 81, Norwegian statistician.
- Buzz Stephen, 79, American baseball player (Minnesota Twins).
- Philip Tagg, 80, British musicologist, writer, and educator.
- Dennis Thompson, 75, American Hall of Fame drummer (MC5), complications from a heart attack.
- Jon Urbanchek, 87, Hungarian-born American Hall of Fame swimming coach (University of Michigan, five Olympic teams), complications from Parkinson's disease.
- Andrés Vega Delfín, 93, Mexican folk guitarist.
- William Barry Wood III, 86, American biologist.

=== 10 ===
- Svetomir Arsić-Basara, 95, Serbian sculptor and writer.
- Mary Banotti, 84, Irish politician, MEP (1984–2004).
- Gordon Brown, British dealer.
- Bob Bruggers, 80, American football player (Miami Dolphins, San Diego Chargers) and professional wrestler.
- Kostas Chatzimichail, 92, Greek football player (AEK Athens) and manager (Doxa Drama, Kalamata).
- Geir Dahlen, 63, Norwegian Olympic road racing cyclist (1988).
- Isa Dongoyaro, 46, Nigerian politician, member of the house of representatives (since 2023).
- Christopher Edley Jr., 71, American legal scholar, complications from surgery.
- Hugh Edwards, 90, Australian journalist, writer (Islands of Angry Ghosts), and marine photographer.
- Gao Hongbin, 71, Chinese government official, vice minister of agriculture (2007–2013).
- Bruce Maccabee, 82, American physicist and ufologist.
- Tom Marshall, 93, American basketball player (Western Kentucky Hilltoppers, Rochester Royals, Detroit Pistons).
- Richard McClure, 89, Canadian rower, Olympic silver medallist (1956).
- Gerhard Müller, 95, German theologian and clergyman, bishop of the Lutheran Church in Brunswick (1982–1994), bishop of the VELKD (1990–1993).
- Mutang Tagal, 69, Malaysian politician, MP (1982–1990) and president of the Dewan Negara (since 2024).
- Barbara Nawratowicz, 91, Polish actress, journalist, and cabaret artist.
- Patrick Nilan, 82, Australian field hockey player, Olympic bronze (1964) and silver medalist (1968).
- Janis Paterson, 78, New Zealand psychologist and academic.
- Jim Peterson, 82, Canadian politician, MP (1980–1984, 1988–2007) and minister of international trade diversification (2003–2006), heart attack.
- Sam Rubin, 64, American entertainment journalist (KTLA), heart attack.
- Karen Saribekyan, 60, Armenian technician and politician, MP (2007–2017).
- Bodo Seidenthal, 76, German engineer and politician, MP (1987–2002).
- Frank Sibley, 76, English footballer (Queens Park Rangers), complications from Parkinson's disease.
- André Simonazzi, 55, Swiss politician and journalist.
- Jim Simons, 86, American mathematician (Simons' formula, Chern-Simons form), and hedge fund manager, founder of Renaissance Technologies.
- Ali Suheimat, 87–88, Jordanian politician and engineer, mayor of Amman (1989–1991).
- Jan Svanberg, 88, Swedish art historian. (death announced on this date)
- Alan Unwin, 82, Canadian politician, mayor of St. Catharines (1994–1997).
- Renaud Van Ruymbeke, 71, French magistrate, cancer.
- Hans Wahlgren, 86, Swedish actor (Wahlgrens värld, Good Friends and Faithful Neighbours, Rederiet).
- Corey Williams, 46, American basketball player (Dakota Wizards, Townsville Crocodiles, Melbourne United), colon cancer.
- Martin Young, 76, British television reporter and investigative journalist, liver cancer.
- Vladimir Zharikov, 85, Russian actor, stuntman (The Meeting Place Cannot Be Changed) and stunt coordinator.

=== 11 ===
- Steve Andrascik, 75, Canadian ice hockey player (New York Rangers, Hershey Bears, Indianapolis Racers).
- Susan Backlinie, 77, American actress (Jaws, Day of the Animals, 1941), heart attack.
- Joël Beaugendre, 74, French politician, member of the National Assembly (2002–2007).
- Terry Blair, 62, American convicted serial killer.
- Kevin Brophy, 70, American actor (Lucan, The Long Riders, Hell Night).
- Luc Bürgin, 53, Swiss writer, publicist, and journalist (Baslerstab).
- John Barnard Bush, 87, British farmer and public servant, lord lieutenant of Wiltshire (2004–2012).
- Peter C. Eagler, 69, American politician, member of the New Jersey General Assembly (2002–2006).
- Ron Ellis, 79, Canadian ice hockey player (Toronto Maple Leafs), Stanley Cup champion (1967).
- Tito Gotti, 96, Italian orchestra conductor, musicologist, and essayist.
- Imre Kemény, 92, Hungarian Olympic rower.
- Rudolf Kučera, 84, Czech footballer (Dukla Prague, Czechoslovakia national team).
- Rubén Monasterios, 86, Venezuelan writer and theatre critic.
- Colin Moyle, 94, New Zealand politician, MP (1963–1976, 1981–1990) and two-time minister of agriculture.
- Jajang Paliama, 39, Indonesian footballer (PS Mojokerto Putra, Persibo Bojonegoro, Persepam Madura Utama), traffic collision.
- Surjit Patar, 79, Indian writer and poet.
- Dave Pivec, 80, American football player (Los Angeles Rams, Denver Broncos).
- David Redden, 75, American auctioneer, complications from amyotropic lateral sclerosis.
- Haider Akbar Khan Rono, 81, Bangladeshi political activist.
- Richard Slayman, 62, American transplant patient.
- Juan María Traverso, 73, Argentine racing driver (Turismo Carretera, TC2000, European Formula Two), esophageal cancer.
- Ray Vandeveer, 70, American politician, member of the Minnesota House of Representatives (1998–2007) and Senate (2007–2013).
- Per Walsøe, 80, Danish badminton player and jurist.
- Mary Wells Lawrence, 95, American advertising executive.
- Jasper White, 69, American chef, restaurateur and cookbook author, brain aneurysm.
- John A. Wickham Jr., 95, American military officer, chief of staff (1983–1987).
- Vladimir Yastrebchak, 44, Transnistrian politician, minister of foreign affairs (2008–2012).

=== 12 ===
- T. D. Allman, 79, American historian and writer, pneumonia.
- Cuno Barragan, 91, American baseball player (Chicago Cubs), heart failure.
- Amália Barros, 39, Brazilian politician and journalist, federal deputy (since 2023), complications from surgery.
- Dick Bown, 95, American racing driver.
- Reg Burgess, 89, Australian footballer (Essendon).
- Michael Brudenell-Bruce, 8th Marquess of Ailesbury, 98, British hereditary peer, army officer and stockbroker, member of the House of Lords (1974–1999), fall.
- Mark Damon, 91, American actor (House of Usher, Ringo and His Golden Pistol) and film producer (Monster).
- Dame Elizabeth Fradd, 75, British nursing administrator.
- Pavithra Jayaram, 53, Indian actress (Buchinaidu Kandriga), traffic collision.
- Sir Clive Johnstone, 60, British Royal Navy officer.
- Tapiwa Kumbuyani, 41, Zimbabwean footballer (CAPS United, national team), liver cancer.
- Stig Lindewall, 87, Swedish Olympic gymnast (1960, 1964).
- Ron Lynch, 84, Australian rugby league player (Parramatta, Penrith, national team) and coach.
- Javier Manterola, 87, Spanish civil engineer, member of the Real Academia de Bellas Artes de San Fernando.
- Franca Nuti, 95, Italian actress (Marco Visconti).
- Luko Paljetak, 80, Croatian poet, writer, and puppeteer.
- Joy Parr, 74–75, Canadian historian, winner of the J.B. Tyrrell Historical Medal (2000).
- Paulo César Pereio, 83, Brazilian actor (The Guns, The Brave Warrior, Iracema: Uma Transa Amazônica).
- Jason Pickleman, 59, American graphic designer and artist.
- David Sanborn, 78, American alto saxophonist (Young Americans) and television host (Night Music), six-time Grammy winner, prostate cancer.
- A. J. Smith, 75, American football player, coach and executive, prostate cancer.
- Igor Sysoyev, 43, Russian Olympic triathlete (2004, 2008), traffic collision.
- James Williams, 57, British Olympic fencer (1992, 1996, 2000).

=== 13 ===
- Talal Abu Zarifa, Palestinian communist militant and politician (Democratic Front for the Liberation of Palestine), airstrike.
- Nataša Bajin-Šljepica, 78, Serbian Olympic gymnast.
- Richard Bolton, 80, New Zealand rugby league player (Auckland, national team) and coach (New Zealand Māori).
- Yevgeniy Brago, 95, Russian rower, Olympic silver medalist (1952).
- Berkley Cox, 90, Australian footballer (Carlton).
- Dai Lixin, 99, Chinese chemist and academician.
- Joseph G. Di Pinto, 92, American politician, member of the Delaware House of Representatives (1987–2006).
- Christian Escoudé, 76, French Gypsy jazz guitarist.
- Bill Friday, 91, Canadian ice hockey referee, cancer.
- Iswar Prasanna Hazarika, 87, Indian politician, MP (1996–1998), heart disease.
- Arthur Irving, 93, Canadian petroleum executive, chairman of Irving Oil (since 1992).
- Albert C. Jones, 79, American politician, member of the New Hampshire House of Representatives (1972–1976).
- Fred Kajoba, 54, Ugandan football player and coach (Simba).
- Waibhav Anil Kale, 46, Indian army officer and United Nations peacekeeper, killed.
- Endel Kiisa, 86, Estonian motorcycle racer.
- Boniface Madubunyi, 90, Nigerian businessman.
- Lucien Mias, 93, French rugby union player (Narbonne, national team).
- Josef Michl, 85, Czech-American chemist, Schrödinger Medal and James Flack Norris Award recipient.
- Sushil Kumar Modi, 72, Indian politician, Bihar MLA (1990–2004), deputy chief minister of Bihar (2005–2013, 2017–2020), and twice MP, cancer.
- Alice Munro, 92, Canadian short story writer (Dance of the Happy Shades, Lives of Girls and Women, Runaway), Nobel Prize laureate (2013), complications from dementia.
- Billy Murphy, 80, American baseball player (New York Mets).
- Native Upmanship, 31, Irish racehorse.
- Susanne Page, 86, American photographer.
- Marius Peiris, 82, Sri Lankan Roman Catholic prelate, auxiliary bishop of Colombo (2000–2018).
- Joseph E. Potter, American sociologist.
- Birubala Rabha, 70, Indian human rights activist, esophageal cancer.
- Loftus Roker, 88, Bahamian politician.
- Clarence Sasser, 76, American soldier, Medal of Honor recipient.
- M. Selvarasu, 67, Indian politician, MP (1989–1991, 1996–1998, since 2019).
- Luis María Serra, 82, Argentine musician and composer (La Mary, Camila, I, the Worst of All).
- Uta Titze-Stecher, 81, German schoolteacher and politician, MP (1990–2002).
- Cyril Wecht, 93, American forensic pathologist, Allegheny County Medical Examiner (1970–1980, 1996–2006).
- Samm-Art Williams, 78, American playwright (Home), actor (Blood Simple) and television producer (The Fresh Prince of Bel-Air).

=== 14 ===
- Édgar Alarcón, 63, Peruvian politician, deputy (2020–2021), traffic collision.
- Bob Ashley, 70, American politician, member of the West Virginia House of Delegates (1985–1999, 2001–2015) and Senate (2015–2017).
- Sue K. Brown, 75, American diplomat, ambassador Montenegro (2011–2015).
- Fabián Cancelarich, 58, Argentine footballer (Ferro Carril Oeste, Belgrano, Platense), heart attack.
- Norman L. Crabill, 97, American aerospace engineer.
- Diane Deans, 65, Canadian politician, member of Ottawa City Council (1994–2022), ovarian cancer.
- Ayten Gökçer, 84, Turkish actress (Red Istanbul).
- Harchibald, 25, Irish racehorse. (death announced on this date)
- Baiba Indriksone, 92, Latvian actress (A Limousine the Colour of Midsummer's Eve, The Devil's Servants).
- Jimmy James, 83, Jamaican-British singer ("Now Is the Time", "I'll Go Where Your Music Takes Me"), complications from Parkinson's disease and a heart condition.
- Narong Kittikachorn, 90, Thai politician, MP (1983–1992).
- Maxim Kononenko, 53, Russian journalist and political activist, internal bleeding.
- Jacques Monet, 94, Canadian historian and Roman Catholic priest.
- Dene O'Kane, 61, New Zealand snooker player, fall.
- Don Perlin, 94, American comic book artist (Werewolf by Night, Ghost Rider, Transformers), co-creator of Moon Knight.
- Mélanie Renaud, 42, Canadian singer, ovarian cancer.
- Ramón Rocha, 84, Spanish politician, member of the Assembly of Extremadura (1995–2003) and mayor of Olivenza (1979–2007).
- Netiporn Sanesangkhom, 28, Thai political activist, cardiac arrest.
- Ian Stirling, 82, Canadian biologist.
- Owen John Thomas, 84, Welsh politician, AM (1999–2007).
- Doug Underwood, 77, Australian motorcycle speedway rider.
- Gudrun Ure, 98, Scottish actress (Super Gran, The Million Pound Note, The Crow Road).
- Nicholas A. Veliotes, 95, American diplomat, ambassador to Jordan (1978–1981) and Egypt (1984–1986).
- Trudi Walend, 80, American politician, member of the North Carolina House of Representatives (1999–2009, 2012–2013), complications from a fall.
- Mark Wells, 66, American ice hockey player, Olympic champion (1980).
- Tony Windis, 91, American basketball player (Detroit Pistons).

=== 15 ===
- Abdellatif Abdelhamid, 70, Syrian film director (Layali Ibn Awa, Nassim al-Roh, Qamaran wa Zaytouna).
- Hisham Arafat, 60, Egyptian politician, minister of transport (2017–2019), cancer.
- Kamla Beniwal, 97, Indian politician, governor of Tripura (2009), Gujarat (2009–2014), and Mizoram (2014).
- Jeanne Bisgood, 100, English amateur golfer.
- Karin Bohle-Lawrenz, 66, German schoolteacher and politician, member of the Bürgerschaft of Bremen (2007–2011).
- Ron Brewer, 87, Canadian football player (Toronto Argonauts, Montreal Alouettes, Edmonton Eskimos).
- Frederic J. Brown III, 89, American lieutenant general.
- Imma Costa, 62, Spanish politician, senator (2023) and mayor of El Montmell (2003–2019).
- Richard Duncan-Jones, 86, British historian.
- Darren Dutchyshen, 57, Canadian sportscaster (SportsCentre), prostate cancer.
- Barbra Fuller, 102, American actress (Adventures of Superman, Four Star Playhouse, My Three Sons).
- Vlastimil Harapes, 77, Czech actor (Marketa Lazarová, Jak dostat tatínka do polepšovny, Beauty and the Beast), ballet dancer and choreographer, lung cancer.
- Pete Hart, 91, American football player (New York Titans).
- John Hastings, 82, Canadian politician, Ontario MPP (1995–2003) and Toronto District School Board trustee (2006–2014).
- John Hawken, 84, English keyboardist (The Nashville Teens, Renaissance, Strawbs), melanoma.
- Komao Hayashi, 87, Japanese dollmaker.
- Malti Joshi, 89, Indian novelist.
- Barry Kemp, 84, English archaeologist and Egyptologist.
- Tates Locke, 87, American basketball coach (Clemson Tigers, Jacksonville Dolphins, Indiana State Sycamores).
- Bob McCreadie, 73, American racing driver (Super DIRTcar Series).
- June Mendoza, 99, Australian portrait painter, stroke.
- Patrick Moenaert, 75, Belgian politician, mayor of Bruges (1995–2012), cancer.
- Elda Peralta, 91, Mexican actress (Hypocrite, Streetwalker, A Woman Without Love).
- Yvon Picotte, 82, Canadian politician, Quebec MNA (1970–1994).
- Ahmed Piro, 92, Moroccan singer.
- Washington Rodrigues, 87, Brazilian football color commentator (Super Rádio Tupi).
- James R. Roebuck Jr., 79, American politician, member of the Pennsylvania House of Representatives (1985–2020), complications from hypertension and diabetes.
- Katherine Wei-Sender, 93, Chinese-American bridge player and author.
- Hans-Georg Wieck, 96, German diplomat.
- Heinz Zander, 84, German painter.
- Joe Zucker, 83, American artist, multiple organ failure.

=== 16 ===
- Carmen Berenguer, 77, Chilean poet.
- John Brown, 76, English footballer (Preston North End, Wigan Athletic).
- Montserrat Casas, 90, Spanish Roman Catholic nun, abbess of the Royal Monastery of Santa Maria de Pedralbes (since 2013).
- Dabney Coleman, 92, American actor (9 to 5, Tootsie, The Guardian), Emmy winner (1987), cardiac arrest.
- Randy Fuller, 80, American singer, songwriter and bass guitarist (The Bobby Fuller Four).
- Vishwas Gangurde, Indian politician, Maharashtra MLA (1999–2004).
- Ken Gardner, 74, American basketball player (Utah Utes, Utah Stars).
- Eddie Gossage, 65, American motorsports promoter (Texas Motor Speedway), cancer.
- Antero Greco, 69, Brazilian journalist (ESPN, O Estado de S. Paulo), cancer.
- Zari Khoshkam, 76, Iranian actress (What's the Time in Your World?).
- Silvio Luiz, 89, Brazilian sports commentator (Rede Bandeirantes, SBT, Rede Record), stroke.
- Enrique Méndez Jr., 92, Puerto Rican major general.
- Akira Nakao, 81, Japanese actor (Minbo, Godzilla Against Mechagodzilla, Ninja Wars), heart failure.
- Vineet Nayyar, 85, Indian information technology executive, chairman of Mahindra Satyam (since 2009).
- Greg Newman, 38, American college football player (University of Utah), multiple organ failure.
- Park Myeong-seo, 85, South Korean politician, MP (1992–1996).
- Dale Power, 74, Canadian tennis player, blood and bladder cancer.
- Jaye Robinson, 61, Canadian politician, member of Toronto City Council (since 2018), breast cancer.
- Carmen Sheila, 79, Brazilian voice actress (TV Colosso).
- Dharmapaal Barsingh Thapa, 85, Nepali military officer, chief of Army Staff (1995–1999), lung disease.
- Verónica Toussaint, 48, Mexican actress (Impossible Things) and television presenter (¡Qué chulada!), breast cancer.

=== 17 ===
- John Alksne, 90, American neurosurgeon and academic.
- Bud Anderson, 102, American Air Force colonel and flying ace.
- Steve Baer, 85, American inventor.
- Gordon Bell, 89, American electrical engineer (Bell's law of computer classes), aspiration pneumonia.
- Thaneswar Boro, 85, Indian politician, Assam MLA (1985–2001), heart disease.
- Pat Buckley, 72, Irish independent Catholic bishop.
- Charlie Colin, 57, American bassist and guitarist (Train, The Side Deal), fall.
- Graham Cox, 65, English footballer (Brentford, Addlestone & Weybridge Town, Aldershot).
- Mahlon DeLong, 86, American neurologist.
- Isabella Dryden, 106, Canadian educator.
- Garba Duba, 82, Nigerian army general and politician, governor of Sokoto State (1984–1985) and Bauchi State (1978–1979).
- Tony Ekubia, 64, Nigerian-British boxer.
- Charles Gittins, 67, American lawyer.
- Sid Going, 80, New Zealand Hall of Fame rugby union player (North Auckland, national team).
- Anthony Haswell, 93, American attorney and passenger rail advocate.
- Malcolm Hill, 85, Australian rules footballer (Hawthorn, Sturt).
- James Hubbell, 92, American visual artist.
- Pål Johannessen, 65, Norwegian actor (Olsen Gang), heart attack.
- Schuyler Jones, 94, American archaeologist and anthropologist.
- Avtandil Jorbenadze, 73, Georgian politician, minister of health and social affairs (1993–2001).
- Yukio Kurita, 94, Japanese politician, governor of Fukui Prefecture (1987–2003).
- Lou Lieberman, 85, Australian politician, Victoria MLA (1976–1992) and MP (1993–2001).
- Roberta Marrero, 52, Spanish artist, singer and actress, suicide.
- Bette Nash, 88, American flight attendant and Guinness World Record holder, breast cancer.
- Benny Petrus, 67, American politician, member of the Arkansas House of Representatives (2007–2012).
- Gene E. K. Pratter, 75, American jurist, judge of the U.S. District Court for the Eastern District of Pennsylvania (since 2004).
- Aminur Rahman, 69, Bangladeshi footballer (Sadharan Bima CSC, Team BJMC, national team), heart failure.
- Stephen J. Rivele, 75, American screenwriter (Nixon, Ali, Pawn Sacrifice).
- Anne deBlois Smart, 88, American-born Canadian librarian and politician, Saskatchewan MLA (1986–1991).
- Príamo Tejeda, 90, Dominican Roman Catholic prelate, auxiliary bishop of Santo Domingo (1975–1986) and bishop of Baní (1986–1997).
- Hideyuki Umezu, 68, Japanese voice actor (Mobile Suit Gundam ZZ, Holly the Ghost, Shrine of the Morning Mist), pneumonia.
- Denys Vasyliuk, 31, Ukrainian fighter pilot, shot down.
- Sharkey Ward, 80, British Royal Navy officer and aviator, heart attack.
- Peter Weber, 85, German gymnast, Olympic bronze medalist (1964, 1968).
- Wilfried Wesch, 83, German Olympic racewalker (1972).

=== 18 ===
- Edgeir Benum, 84, Norwegian historian.
- Willi Brokmeier, 96, German tenor (Bavarian State Opera).
- Peter Buxtun, 86, Czech-born American whistleblower (Tuskegee Syphilis Study), complications from Alzheimer's disease.
- Palle Danielsson, 77, Swedish jazz double bassist.
- Yael Dayan, 85, Israeli writer and politician, MK (1992–2003), lung disease.
- Joseph Suren Gomes, 80, Indian Roman Catholic prelate, bishop of Krishnagar (2002–2019), heart failure.
- Patrick Gottsch, 70, American media executive.
- Geane Herrera, 33, American mixed martial artist, traffic collision.
- Frank Ifield, 86, Australian singer ("I Remember You", "Lovesick Blues", "The Wayward Wind").
- John Koerner, 85, American songwriter and guitarist (Koerner, Ray & Glover), bile duct cancer.
- Andrey Kudriashov, 32, Russian motorcycle speedway racer, skin cancer.
- Araceli Limcaco-Dans, 94, Filipino painter and educator.
- Agustín Ramón Martínez, 62, Israeli-Paraguayan serial killer and fraudster.
- Jerrold Northrop Moore, 90, American-born British musicologist.
- Luis Moroder, 83, Italian peptide chemist.
- Ivan Mráz, 82, Slovak football player (Slovan Bratislava, Czechoslovakia national team) and manager (Alajuelense), Olympic silver medalist (1964).
- Janice K. Nicolay, 82, American politician, member of the South Dakota House of Representatives (1983–1996).
- Bruce Nordstrom, 90, American retail executive, chairman of Nordstrom (1968–1995, 2000–2006).
- Sir Tony O'Reilly, 88, Irish media executive, owner of Mediahuis Ireland (1973–2009), and rugby union player (Barbarians, national team).
- George Papageorgiou, 68, American college football player (Washington Huskies) and coach (Bethel Threshers, Benedictine Ravens).
- Pequeño Nitro, 40, Mexican professional wrestler.
- Alberto Piazza, 82, Italian geneticist (University of Turin).
- Claude Pujade-Renaud, 92, Tunisian-born French writer.
- Fred Roos, 89, American film producer (The Godfather Part II, Apocalypse Now, The Outsiders), Oscar winner (1975).
- Salim Haji Said, 80, Indonesian journalist and academician.
- Tim Seely, 88, English actor (Sally's Irish Rogue, Please Turn Over, King Ralph).
- Jerald D. Slack, 88, American air force major general, cancer.
- Alice Stewart, 58, American political commentator (CNN).
- Guy R. Strong, 93, American college basketball coach (Kentucky Wesleyan Panthers, Eastern Kentucky Colonels, Oklahoma State Cowboys).
- Md. Wali Ullah, 87, Bangladeshi politician, MP (1991–1996).
- Narayanan Vaghul, 88, Indian banker, chairman of the Bank of India (1981–1984).
- Francisco Villagrán de León, 70, Guatemalan diplomat, academic and presidential advisor, ambassador to the United States (2008–2011, 2012–2013), complications from a fall.
- Harrison White, 94, American sociologist (vacancy chains, blockmodels).
- Rahmatullo Zoirov, 67, Tajik legal scholar and human rights activist.

=== 19 ===
- Bola Afonja, 81, Nigerian politician, minister of labour (1993).
- Marshall Allen, 52, American journalist (Las Vegas Sun, ProPublica), heart attack.
- Larry Bensky, 87, American journalist and radio host.
- Prataprao Baburao Bhosale, 89, Indian politician, MP (1999–2009) and Maharashtra MLA (1967–1985).
- Peggi Blu, 77, American singer and vocal coach.
- Caroline Dawson, 45, Chilean-born Canadian writer, bone cancer.
- Peder Falk, 76, Swedish actor (Nya tider, Vägen till Gyllenblå!, Smash).
- Richard Foronjy, 86, American actor (Serpico, Midnight Run, Carlito's Way).
- Sir Cyril Fountain, 94, Bahamian judge and lawyer, chief justice (1995–1996).
- Franchino, 71, Italian disc jockey, complications from a heart attack.
- H. Bruce Franklin, 90, American scholar, corticobasal degeneration.
- Aloísio Teixeira Garcia, 80, Brazilian academic and politician, Minas Gerais MLA (1987–1991).
- James L. Greenfield, 99, American newspaper editor (The New York Times) and government official, assistant secretary of state for public affairs (1964–1966), kidney failure.
- Ian Hamilton, 73, English footballer (Aston Villa, Sheffield United, Minnesota Kicks).
- Sjef Hensgens, 76, Dutch Olympic middle-distance runner (1972).
- Kwassi Klutse, 78, Togolese politician, prime minister (1996–1999).
- Ali Al-Kourani, 79, Lebanese Islamic cleric, heart attack.
- Dick Kuiper, 85, Dutch academic and politician, senator (1983–1995).
- Christian Malanga, 41, Congolese politician and military officer, leader of the 2024 Democratic Republic of the Congo coup attempt, shot.
- Jim Otto, 86, American Hall of Fame football player (Oakland Raiders).
- Sigmund Rolat, 93, Polish philanthropist, art collector, and Holocaust survivor, founding donor of POLIN Museum of the History of Polish Jews.
- Bruno Siebert, 91, Chilean Army general and politician, minister of public works (1982–1989) and senator (1990–1998).
- Stephen Smalley, 93, British religious leader, Dean of Chester (1987–2001).
- Don Stiller, 87, American football player (Edmonton Eskimos).
- Claude Villeneuve, 69, Canadian academic and biologist.
- Bill Wood, 88, Australian politician, Queensland MP (1969–1974), ACT MLA (1989–2004).
- Iranian politicians killed in the 2024 Varzaqan helicopter crash:
  - Mohammad Ali Ale-Hashem, 61, representative of the Supreme Leader in East Azerbaijan (since 2017)
  - Hossein Amir-Abdollahian, 60, minister of foreign affairs (since 2021), ambassador to Bahrain (2007–2010)
  - Malek Rahmati, 41–42, governor-general of East Azerbaijan (since 2024)
  - Ebrahim Raisi, 63, president (since 2021), chief justice (2019–2021), and prosecutor-general (2014–2016)

=== 20 ===
- Bad Bones, 40, German professional wrestler (WXW, TNA), heart attack.
- Ivan Boesky, 87, American insider trader.
- Kevin Burns, 63, New Zealand cricketer (Southland, Otago).
- Sam Butcher, 85, American artist (Precious Moments).
- Gerry Collins, 69, Scottish football player (Ayr United, Hamilton Academical, Partick Thistle) and manager.
- Aida Cruz, 101, Filipino architect, heart failure.
- Ellis Douek, 90, Egyptian-born British surgeon.
- Graham Evans, 79, British Olympic field hockey player.
- Jean-Claude Gaudin, 84, French politician, senator (1998–2017), minister of the city (1995–1997), and mayor of Marseille (1995–2020).
- Gebhard Halder, 81, Austrian farmer and politician, president of the Landtag of Vorarlberg (2004–2009).
- John E. Hales Jr., 81, American meteorologist, bladder cancer.
- Emmanuel Hendrickx, 84, Belgian lawyer and politician, governor of Walloon Brabant (2000–2006).
- Hossain Uddin Hossain, 83, Bangladeshi essayist and novelist.
- Thomas W. Long, 94, American politician, member of the New Jersey General Assembly (1983–1986).
- Fernando Martínez Castellano, 82, Spanish politician, mayor of Valencia (1979).
- Eiko Masuyama, 88, Japanese voice actress (Lupin III).
- Tom McGreevey, 91, American actor (The Uncle Al Show).
- Henry McKean, 93, American mathematician.
- Bertus Mulder, 95, Dutch architect (Rietveld Schröder House).
- Gary Okihiro, 79, American academic.
- David Penny, 85, New Zealand evolutionary biologist, Rutherford Medal (2004), Fellow of the Royal Society of New Zealand (since 1990).
- Fran Rooney, 67, Irish footballer (Shamrock Rovers, Home Farm, St Patrick's Athletic) and businessman, cancer.
- Karl-Heinz Schnellinger, 85, German footballer (FC Köln, AC Milan, West Germany national team).
- Bill Serong, 88, Australian footballer (Collingwood, North Melbourne).
- Ewa Sikorska-Trela, 81, Polish trade unionist and politician, MP (1997–2001).
- Perrette Souplex, 94, French actress (Paris Still Sings, Suspicion, La smala).
- Hans Joachim Specht, 87, German nuclear physicist.
- Edward Trobaugh, 91, American army major general.
- Frank Yandrisevits, 69, American politician, member of the Pennsylvania House of Representatives (1985–1990, 1993–1994).
- Vladimir Yereshchenko, 61, Russian Olympic boxer (1988).

=== 21 ===
- Vladimir Agapov, 90, Russian football player (Spartak Moscow, Soviet Union national team) and manager (CSKA Moscow).
- Sajjad Akbar, 63, Pakistani cricketer (national team), heart attack.
- Louis Bergaud, 95, French road bicycle racer.
- Robert Castelli, 74, American security consultant and politician, member of the New York State Assembly (2010–2013).
- Ralph Chapoteau, 69, Haitian painter, cancer.
- Joan Cushing, 77, American political satirist, complications from Parkinson's disease.
- Richard Ellis, 86, American marine biologist, cardiac arrest.
- Hank Foiles, 94, American baseball player (Cleveland Indians, Pittsburgh Pirates, Cincinnati Reds).
- Frank Galle, 87, Australian rules footballer (North Melbourne).
- Stanley P. Goldstein, 89, American businessman, co-founder of CVS Health, cancer.
- Werner Hink, 81, Austrian violinist.
- Gene Nora Jessen, 87, American aviator (Mercury 13).
- Jan A. P. Kaczmarek, 71, Polish film composer (Finding Neverland, Unfaithful, The Visitor), Oscar winner (2005), complications from multiple system atrophy.
- Ona Kreivytė-Naruševičienė, 88, Lithuanian ceramic artist.
- Heljä Liukko-Sundström, 85, Finnish artist.
- Manu Majumdar, 64, Bangladeshi politician, MP (2019–2024).
- Leocadio Marín, 81, Spanish politician, mayor of Baeza (2007–2015) and member of the Andalusian parliament (1982–1986, 1990–1994).
- Florence Minor, 74, American children's author.
- Carlos Paravís, 56, Uruguayan physician and folk singer, esophageal cancer.
- Bastiaan Poortenaar, 55, Dutch Olympic field hockey player (1992), cardiac arrest.
- Pendyala Venkata Krishna Rao, 84, Indian politician, member of the Andhra Pradesh Legislative Assembly (1983–1994, 2004–2009).
- James Selfe, 68, South African politician, MP (1994–2021).
- Günter Weitling, 89, Danish theologian, historian, and author. (death announced on this date)
- Danny Wells, 84, American politician, member of the West Virginia House of Delegates (2005–2014).
- Gary Willard, 64, English football referee, leukaemia. (death announced on this date)
- Kiane Zawadi, 91, American jazz trombonist and euphonium player.

=== 22 ===
- Md. Anwarul Azim Anar, 56, Bangladeshi politician, MP (since 2014). (body discovered on this date)
- Zoraya ter Beek, 29, Dutch psychiatric patient, euthanized.
- Rolf-Ernst Breuer, 86, German businessman and jurist, CEO of Deutsche Bank (1997–2002).
- Diana Cabeza, 69, Argentine architect and designer, cancer.
- Barry Davis, 80, Australian footballer (Essendon, North Melbourne).
- Margaret Bryan Davis, 92, American palynologist and paleoecologist.
- Gaetano Di Vaio, 56, Italian actor (Gomorrah), screenwriter (Napoli, Napoli, Napoli) and producer (Per amor vostro), traffic collision.
- Peter Dusek, 79, Austrian historian, archivist, and journalist.
- John England, 83, New Zealand cricketer (Canterbury).
- Marie-France Garaud, 90, French politician and political advisor, MEP (1999–2004).
- Bob Grant, 77, American football player (Baltimore Colts, Washington Redskins).
- L. Martin Griffin, 103, American environmentalist.
- Darryl Hickman, 92, American actor (The Grapes of Wrath, Leave Her to Heaven, Fighting Father Dunne).
- Toni Montano, 62, Serbian rock musician.
- Hiroshi Nakamura, 93–94, Japanese dissident.
- Mimoza Nestorova-Tomić, 94–95, Macedonian architect, planner, and urban designer (reconstruction of Skopje 1963).
- Othon, 79, Brazilian football player (1964 Olympics) and manager (Botafogo, América Mineiro).
- Silvia Reyes, 75, Spanish LGBTI rights activist.
- Brian Ridley, 93, British physicist.
- Dorothy Ross, 87, American historian.
- Iqbal Ahmed Saradgi, 79, Indian politician, MP (1999–2009).
- Shin Kyeong-nim, 88, South Korean poet, cancer.
- Petri Sulonen, 60, Finnish footballer (FC Jazz, Turun Palloseura, national team), complications from amyotrophic lateral sclerosis.
- John Upham, 83, Canadian baseball player (Chicago Cubs).
- Paul Vermeulen, 86, French racing cyclist.
- Manfried Welan, 86, Austrian lawyer and politician, third president of the Municipal Council and Landtag of Vienna (1988–1991).
- Vic White, 92, English motorcycle speedway rider, promoter and manager.
- David Wilkie, 70, Scottish swimmer, Olympic champion (1976), world champion (1973, 1975), cancer.
- Brian Denis Wilson, 99, British Army officer and colonial administrator.

=== 23 ===
- Franco Anelli, 60, Italian academic administrator, rector of Università Cattolica del Sacro Cuore (since 2012), suicide by jumping.
- Sir John Boardman, 96, British archaeologist and art historian.
- Caleb Carr, 68, American author (The Alienist, The Angel of Darkness, The Italian Secretary), cancer.
- Marc Camille Chaimowicz, 77, French artist.
- Valery Chtak, 42, Russian conceptual artist.
- Destiny Deacon, 67, Australian indigenous photographer.
- Travis Flores, 33, American writer, activist, and motivational speaker, complications from cystic fibrosis.
- Ángeles Flórez Peón, 105, Spanish socialist militant, writer and Civil War veteran.
- Russell Fraser, 90, Canadian politician, British Columbia MLA (1983–1991).
- Alan B. Handler, 92, American judge, justice of the New Jersey Supreme Court (1977–1999).
- Ibrahim Haydari, 88, Iraqi sociologist. (death announced on this date)
- Karel Hradil, 87, Czech Olympic sprint canoer.
- Janusz Mazurek, 80, Polish politician, senator (1991–1993).
- Sonja Morawetz Sinclair, 102, Czechoslovak-born Canadian journalist, author, and cryptographer.
- P. N. Patil, 71, Indian politician, Maharashtra MLA (since 2019), fall.
- Greg Philo, 76, English sociologist.
- John Albert Raven, 82, British botanist.
- Terry Robards, 84, American wine critic.
- John Maddox Roberts, 76, American author (SPQR, Conan the Valorous, Hannibal's Children).
- Harry John Roland, 70, American orator, heart attack.
- Emanuel Schegloff, 86, American linguist and sociologist.
- Rudolf Spoor, 85, Dutch television director.
- Morgan Spurlock, 53, American film director (Super Size Me, Where in the World Is Osama bin Laden?, Comic-Con Episode IV: A Fan's Hope), cancer.
- Eric Upton, 71, Canadian football player (Edmonton Eskimos).
- Virginia V. Weldon, 88, Canadian-born American pediatric endocrinologist.

=== 24 ===
- Leslie Adams, 91, American composer.
- Minerva Allen, 90, American poet.
- Jorge Arganis Díaz Leal, 81, Mexican civil engineer, secretary of infrastructure, communications and transport (2020–2022).
- Heather Ayrton, 89–90, New Zealand coroner and journalist.
- Ayo Banjo, 90, Nigerian academic administrator, vice-chancellor of the University of Ibadan (1984–1991).
- George William Coleman, 85, American Roman Catholic prelate, bishop of Fall River (2003–2014).
- Júlio Sarmento da Costa, 64, East Timorese politician, MP (2017–2018).
- Ena Cremona, 88, Maltese jurist.
- Cynthia DeFelice, 72, American author (Signal).
- Rosemary Deloford, 96, British squash and tennis player.
- Nasrullah Gadani, 40, Pakistani journalist and social media activist, shot.
- Angela Gentzmer, 94, German author and songwriter.
- Mark Gormley, 67, American singer-songwriter.
- Jean-Marc Hamel, 99, Canadian civil servant, chief electoral officer (1966–1990).
- Hildegard Hammerschmidt-Hummel, 80, German Shakespearean scholar.
- James A. Herrick, 69, American academic.
- Fred Hissong, 92, American general (United States Army Materiel Command).
- Doug Ingle, 78, American musician (Iron Butterfly) and songwriter ("In-A-Gadda-Da-Vida").
- Kabosu, 18, Japanese Shiba Inu dog and Internet meme (Doge, Dogecoin), leukemia.
- Jan Kačer, 87, Czech actor (Death Is Called Engelchen), theatre director (The Drama Club) and politician, MP (1990–1992).
- Walter Kappacher, 85, Austrian writer.
- Anna Mahase, 91, Trinidadian educator.
- Derek Morgan, 88, Welsh-English rugby union player (Northumberland, England national team).
- José Antonio Murgas, 94, Colombian politician, governor of Cesar (1970–1971) and minister of labour (1973–1974).
- Abdulmalik Jauro Musa, Nigerian politician, member of the Adamawa State House of Assembly.
- Nor Zamri Latiff, 55, Malaysian politician, Penang MLA (since 2023), stomach disease.
- Richard Pascale, 85, American academic, management theorist and business advisor.
- Paul Paviour, 93, English organist, composer and conductor.
- Qiu Weiliu, 91, Chinese engineer.
- Santiago Omar Riveros, 100, Argentine general, clandestine detention center commander and convicted criminal.
- Christian Rudzki, 77, Argentine footballer (Estudiantes, Hannover 96).
- Lew Stansby, 83, American bridge player.
- David Teacher, 100, British World War II veteran.
- David Walker, 82, Australian racing driver (Formula One).
- Xavier Sylvestre Yangongo, 77, Central African general and politician, minister of justice (1982–1984).
- Janusz Edmund Zimniak, 90, Polish Roman Catholic prelate, auxiliary bishop of Katowice (1980–1992) and Bielsko and Żywiec (1992–2010).

=== 25 ===
- Laurie Ackermann, 90, South African judge.
- Mohammad Anwarul Haque, 77, Bangladeshi jurist, justice of the supreme court.
- Carlo J. Caparas, 80, Filipino comics artist (Bakekang, Kamandag) and film director (Kambal Na Kamao: Madugong Engkwentro).
- Mike Cotten, 84, American college football player (Texas Longhorns).
- Rakesh Daultabad, 45, Indian politician, Haryana MLA (since 2019), heart attack.
- Madge Elliot, 95, Scottish rail activist, complications from Alzheimer's disease.
- Hugues Gall, 84, French opera administrator, director of the Paris Opera (1995–2004).
- Gary Gubner, 81, American athlete and Olympic weightlifter (1964).
- Janisa Johnson, 32, American volleyball player, cancer.
- Chip Kell, 75, American Hall of Fame football player (Tennessee Volunteers, Edmonton Eskimos), pneumonia.
- Franciscus Kuijpers, 83, Dutch chess player.
- Ibrahim Lamorde, 61, Nigerian police officer, chairman of the Economic and Financial Crimes Commission (2011–2015).
- Leah Levin, 98, British human rights activist.
- Richard Mazza, 84, American politician, member of the Vermont House of Representatives (1973–1977) and Senate (1985–2024).
- Gladys Smuckler Moskowitz, 96, American singer, composer and teacher.
- Grayson Murray, 30, American golfer, two-time PGA Tour winner, suicide.
- Johnny Ngan, 71, Hong Kong actor (The Seasons, A Kindred Spirit, File of Justice), squamous-cell carcinoma.
- Ōshio Kenji, 76, Japanese sumo wrestler.
- Mathias Asoma Puozaa, 76, Ghanaian politician, MP (2005–2017).
- Peter Rosenthal, 82, American-Canadian mathematician, lawyer, and activist, complications from COVID-19.
- Albert S. Ruddy, 94, American film and television producer (The Godfather, Hogan's Heroes, Million Dollar Baby), Oscar winner (1973, 2005).
- Richard M. Sherman, 95, American film songwriter (Mary Poppins, The Jungle Book, Chitty Chitty Bang Bang), Oscar winner (1965).
- Sanford L. Smith, 84, American businessman, founder of the Outsider Art Fair, heart failure.
- Johnny Wactor, 37, American actor (General Hospital, Siberia, USS Indianapolis: Men of Courage), shot.

=== 26 ===
- John Adams, 85, British geographer. (death announced on this date)
- Georgie Campbell, 37, British event rider, fall.
- Eduardo Contreras Mella, 84, Chilean politician, deputy (1973–1977).
- Samuel Lewis Galindo, 96, Panamanian businessman, politician, and author.
- Scott Ginsburg, 71, American businessman.
- Talat Hussain, 83, Pakistani actor (Karawaan, Jinnah, Actor in Law).
- Klaus Kilimann, 85, German physicist and politician, lord mayor of Rostock (1990–1993).
- Leary Lentz, 79, American basketball player (Houston Mavericks, New York Nets).
- John MacBean, 88, Australian trade unionist, secretary of Labor Council of New South Wales (1984–1989), complications from Parkinson's disease.
- Bertien van Manen, 89, Dutch photographer.
- Devadass Ambrose Mariadoss, 76, Indian Roman Catholic prelate, bishop of Tanjore (1997–2023).
- Carol McFarlane, 73, American politician, member of the Minnesota House of Representatives (2007–2013).
- Tony Scott, 72, American baseball player (Montreal Expos, St. Louis Cardinals, Houston Astros).
- Vinay Shakya, 54, Indian politician, Uttar Pradesh MLA (2017–2022).
- Caroline Sinavaiana-Gabbard, 78, American Samoan academic and writer, stabbed.
- Anant Solkar, 72, Indian cricketer (Railways, Maharashtra).
- Goran Stanisavljević, 60, Serbian football player (SV Ried, Austria Lustenau) and manager (Austria Lustenau).
- Don Webb, 89, British playwright and script writer (Juliet Bravo, Rockliffe's Babies, Byker Grove), prostate cancer.
- Scott Williams, 67, American stencil artist.
- Ludwika Wujec, 83, Polish physicist, politician, and anti-Communist dissident.

=== 27 ===
- Ghigo Agosti, 87, Italian singer-songwriter.
- Salah Omar al-Ali, 85, Iraqi diplomat and politician.
- Ștefan Birtalan, 75, Romanian handball player (Steaua Bucharest, Minerul Baia Mare), coach and sports official, Olympic silver medallist (1976).
- Alan Choe, 93, Singaporean architect and urban planner.
- Joseph A. Day, 79, Canadian politician, senator (2001–2020).
- Rodger Fox, 71, New Zealand jazz trombonist, educator (Massey University) and bandleader.
- Orlando J. George Jr., 79, American academic administrator and politician, member (1974–1995) and speaker (1983–1984) of the Delaware House of Representatives, president of DTCC (1995–2014).
- Butch Johnson, 68, American archer, Olympic champion (1996) and bronze medalist (2000).
- Jan Kieniewicz, 85, Polish historian.
- Elizabeth MacRae, 88, American actress (General Hospital, Gomer Pyle, U.S.M.C., The Conversation).
- David Mayne, 94, South African-born British academic.
- Nancy Norman, 99, American singer.
- Ivan O'Neal, Vincentian politician.
- Otoni de Paula Pai, 71, Brazilian politician, Rio de Janeiro MLA (since 2023), liver cancer.
- Francesco Petrozzi, 62, Peruvian lyric tenor and politician, MP (2016–2019).
- Surya Prakash, Indian film director (Manikkam, Maayi, Diwan).
- Dadash Rzayev, 88, Azerbaijani major general, minister of defence (1993).
- Bill Walton, 71, American Hall of Fame basketball player (UCLA Bruins, Portland Trail Blazers, Boston Celtics), and sportscaster, colorectal cancer.

=== 28 ===
- Terrence Beasor, 89, American actor (The Gangster Chronicles, The Middle, Walk Hard: The Dewey Cox Story).
- Róbert Cvi Bornstein, 98, Slovak resistance fighter and Holocaust survivor.
- Richard Cusimano, 84, American historian.
- Malcolm Fairley, 72, British criminal and sex offender.
- Sverre M. Fjelstad, 93, Norwegian zoologist, photographer, and non-fiction writer.
- Manuel Franquelo, 71, Spanish painter and sculptor.
- Elinor Fuchs, 91, American theatre scholar and critic.
- Bob Gunderman, 89, American football player (Pittsburgh Steelers, Winnipeg Blue Bombers).
- Pauline Harrison, 97, British protein crystallographer.
- Georgette Ioup, 84, American linguist.
- Charles Lindsay Longest, 91, American Episcopal prelate, bishop of Maryland (1989–1997).
- Hugh Macdonald, 80, New Zealand filmmaker.
- Oleksandr Martynenko, 63, Ukrainian journalist and presidential press secretary, deputy chief of the Presidential Administration (1998–2002).
- Jan van Munster, 84, Dutch sculptor and installation artist.
- Mary O'Rourke, Irish barrister.
- George Provopoulos, 74, Greek economist, governor of the Bank of Greece (2008–2014), cancer.
- Hub Reed, 89, American basketball player (Detroit Pistons, Los Angeles Lakers, Cincinnati Royals).
- Morley Rosenberg, 87, Canadian lawyer and politician, mayor of Kitchener (1977–1982).
- John E. Rouille, 92, American law enforcement officer, U.S. Marshal for Vermont (1994–1999).
- Russell T. Scott Jr., 85, American classicist and historian.
- Bill Spence, 101, English writer.
- Ken Tucker, 89, Australian cycling coach (Anna Meares, Kerrie Meares, Kenrick Tucker).
- Jac Venza, 97, American television producer (NET Playhouse, Great Performances).

=== 29 ===
- Hank Allen, 83, American baseball player (Washington Senators, Chicago White Sox, Milwaukee Brewers).
- Ron Ayers, 92, English engineer (ThrustSSC, JCB Dieselmax).
- Sir Mansel Aylward, 81, Welsh physician and academic, chair of Public Health Wales (2009–2017).
- John Beckwith, 91, Australian rules footballer (Melbourne).
- Margot Benacerraf, 97, Venezuelan film director (Reverón, Araya).
- Steve Blyth, 69, Australian rugby league player (Western Suburbs Magpies, Newtown Jets), complications from dementia.
- John Burnside, 69, Scottish writer (Dice) and poet (A Poet's Polemic, Black Cat Bone).
- Larry Cannon, 77, American basketball player (Denver Rockets, Philadelphia 76ers).
- Cayouche, 75, Canadian singer-songwriter, cancer.
- Jack Clemons, 80, American aerospace engineer.
- Gerald Dawe, 72, Irish poet, academic and literary critic.
- André Dupré, 93, French racing cyclist.
- Franziskus Eisenbach, 81, German Roman Catholic prelate, auxiliary bishop of Mainz (1988–2002).
- Pierre Flor-Henry, 90, Canadian psychiatrist.
- Bishop Harris, 82, American football coach (North Carolina Central Eagles).
- Thomas Heise, 68, German documentary filmmaker.
- Larry R. Hicks, 80, American jurist, judge of the U.S. District Court for Nevada (since 2001), traffic collision.
- Nora Houfová, 99, Austrian actress.
- Qayum Karzai, 77, Afghan politician, MP (2004–2008).
- Bob Mackowycz, 55, Canadian musician, writer and broadcaster.
- Henri Nallet, 85, French politician, minister for justice (1990–1992) and agriculture (1985–1986, 1988–1990).
- Alberto Robol, 79, Italian politician, senator (1987–2001).
- Bob Rogers, 97, Australian disc jockey and radio broadcaster (2UE, 2SM, 4BH).
- Erich Sackmann, 90, German biophysicist.
- Mansour Seck, 69, Senegalese singer and musician.
- Inna Solovyova, 96, Russian film and theatre critic.
- Arjen Teeuwissen, 53, Dutch equestrian, Olympic silver medalist (2000).
- Claude Torracinta, 89, French-born Swiss journalist.
- Leslie Watson, 67, New Zealand cricketer (Canterbury), complications from Alzheimer's disease.
- Manfred Wolke, 81, German boxer, Olympic champion (1968).
- Bill Yanchar, 76, American football player (Cleveland Browns).
- Anastasia Zavorotnyuk, 53, Russian actress (My Fair Nanny) and television presenter, glioblastoma.

=== 30 ===
- Thumma Bala, 80, Indian Roman Catholic prelate, archbishop of Hyderabad (2011–2020).
- Mitchell Block, 73, American film producer (Big Mama, Poster Girl, The Testimony).
- Tom Bower, 86, American actor (Die Hard 2, Bad Lieutenant: Port of Call New Orleans, Undoing).
- Ron Branton, 90, Australian footballer (Richmond).
- Nora Cortiñas, 94, Argentine social psychologist and human rights activist, co-founder of Mothers of Plaza de Mayo.
- Bill Creston, 92, American experimental filmmaker.
- Doug Dagger, 56, American punk rock singer (The Generators), cancer.
- Trevor Edwards, 87, Welsh footballer (Charlton Athletic, Cardiff City, national team).
- Kelvin Felix, 91, Dominican Roman Catholic cardinal, archbishop of Castries (1981–2008).
- Danny Fife, 74, American baseball player (Minnesota Twins), complications from Alzheimer's disease.
- Dolores Warwick Frese, 88, American medievalist and writer.
- Geneviève de Galard, 99, French nurse (First Indochina War).
- Drew Gordon, 33, American basketball player (Philadelphia 76ers), traffic collision.
- Hugh Graham, 90, American figure skater.
- Manjur Hossain, 68, Bangladesh politician, MP (2019–2024).
- Kalev Kallo, 75, Estonian politician and convicted criminal.
- Austin Lewis, 91, Australian politician, senator (1976–1993).
- Courtenay Meredith, 97, Welsh rugby player (British Lions, national team).
- John A. Moses, 93, Australian historian and Anglican priest.
- Jon T. Pitts, 76, American mathematician.
- Shelton Premaratne, 94, Sri Lankan composer and instrumentalist.
- Pekka Salminen, 86, Finnish architect.
- Gordon Shrake, 87, Canadian politician, Alberta MLA (1982–1993).
- Kate Tiller, 74–75, British academic.
- Carl A. Trocki, 84, American historian.

=== 31 ===
- Amaral, 69, Brazilian footballer (Guarani, Universidad de Guadalajara, national team), cancer.
- Richard Bawden, 88, English painter, printmaker and designer.
- Peter Beal, 80, British manuscript expert and indexer, pneumonia.
- Elvedin Begić, 63, Bosnian football executive, president of the Football Association of Bosnia and Herzegovina (2012–2021), cancer.
- Berthé Aïssata Bengaly, 67, Malian politician and nutrition researcher.
- Adelaide Carpenter, 79, American fruit fly geneticist.
- Lionel Dyck, 79–80, Zimbabwean mercenary and soldier, cancer.
- Ronald A. Edmonds, 77, American photojournalist, Pulitzer Prize winner (1982), pneumonia.
- John Goold, 82, Australian footballer (Carlton), cancer.
- David Grimmond, 80, Australian rugby union player (Queanbeyan RUFC, national team).
- John G. Hutchinson, 89, American politician, member of the U.S. House of Representatives (1980–1981).
- Alexander Lang, 82, German actor (Solo Sunny) and stage director (Deutsches Theater Berlin, Thalia Theater, Hamburg).
- Ed Mann, 69, American drummer and keyboardist (Frank Zappa).
- Peter Morris, 90, Australian rules footballer (Richmond).
- Ron Morris, 89, American pole vaulter, Olympic silver medalist (1960).
- Yuka Motohashi, 46, Japanese actress (Gekisou Sentai Carranger, Avataro Sentai Donbrothers, Kamen Rider × Kamen Rider OOO & W Featuring Skull: Movie War Core), cancer.
- Robert Pickton, 74, Canadian serial killer, complications from stab wounds.
- Rafael Quevedo Flores, 87–88, Peruvian politician and engineer, minister of agriculture (2010–2011).
- Marian Robinson, 86, American secretary.
- Syed Mumtaz Ali Shah, 91, Pakistani actor.
- Seán Óg Sheehy, 85, Irish Gaelic footballer (John Mitchels GAA, Kerry).
- Kent Shelhamer, 99, American politician, member of the Pennsylvania House of Representatives (1965–1976).
- Martin Starger, 92, American entertainment executive (ABC Entertainment) and film and television producer (Sophie's Choice, Mask).
- William W. Taft, 91, American politician, member of the Ohio House of Representatives (1961–1967) and Senate (1967–1972).
- Kátya Tompos, 41, Hungarian actress (Coming Out, Question in Details) and singer, cancer.
- Scott Wampler, 43–44, American podcaster and film journalist.
- Ruiko Yoshida, 89, Japanese photojournalist.
