= Ken Tucker (cycling coach) =

Australian cycling coach

- Born: 1934 or 1935
- Died: 28 May 2024; Rockhampton, Queensland, Australia
- Other name: Reggie Tucker
- Occupation: Cycling coach
- Known for: Coaching Anna Meares, Kerrie Meares and Kenrick Tucker

Brian Kenrick Tucker (1934 or 1935 – 28 May 2024) was an Australian cycling coach.

He is perhaps best known for coaching Anna Meares, Kerrie Meares and his son Kenrick Tucker.

In an incident at the 1978 Commonwealth Games in Edmonton, Tucker bypassed security at Argyll Velodrome by using another cyclist's security pass to sneak through a tunnel while heavily disguised in a tracksuit top and a stockman's hat to watch his son Kenrick win the gold medal in the men's 1000-metre sprint.

Tucker retired from coaching at the age of 85 in April 2021.

He died on 28 May 2024 at the age of 89. His funeral was held at the Rockhampton Crematorium on 7 June 2024.
