= Boniface Madubunyi =

Nigerian entrepreneur

- Born: 12 December 1933; Ihiala, Colony and Protectorate of Nigeria
- Died: 13 May 2024 (aged 90)
- Education: Electrical Engineering, University College London
- Occupations: Founder, Mabon Limited

Boniface Okonkwo Madubunyi MFR (12 December 1933 – 13 May 2024) was an entrepreneur in the energy sector and real estate. He was the chairman and Founder of Mabon Limited, noted for initiating speculative offshore geological and geophysical surveys and data acquisitions in Nigeria.

== Early life and career ==
Boniface Madubunyi was born on 12 December 1933 in Ihiala, Anambra State, Nigeria. He earned a Bachelor of Science degree in electrical engineering from the University of Manchester and University College London (UCL). He was an Associate Member of the Institute of Electrical Engineers (AMIEE) and a member of the Osborne Reynolds Society at the University of Manchester.

Madubunyi began his career with Seismograph Service (England) Limited, now part of Schlumberger Limited, where he led geophysical field operations for companies such as Shell, Gulf, Agip, and Total Elf. As a consultant to the Nigerian National Petroleum Corporation (NNPC), he advanced seismic studies and mapping of offshore oil blocks.

== Business career ==
Madubunyi was a significant figure in the Mabon Group. He chaired the boards of Mabon Limited, Mabon Geosciences, Mabon Energy Limited, Santa Coast Exploration Ltd, Kingdom Holdings Limited, Kenrose Nig Ltd, and Magellan Exploration and Production Holdings Inc.

Mabon Limited

Founded in 1983, Mabon Limited conducted Nigeria's first speculative offshore geological and geophysical surveys and data acquisitions, gathering nearly 100,000 kilometers of 2D seismic, gravity, and magnetic data offshore Nigeria. This database contributed to Nigeria's foreign exchange earnings through royalties, bidding round fees, and signature bonuses. In cooperation with foreign partners, Mabon Limited delivered Nigeria's first comprehensive deep water regional seismic data in 1991.

Renewable Energy

Madubunyi expanded into the renewable energy sector, securing a concession for a 40MW hydropower plant in Dadin Kowa, Gombe State, with Power China as the EPC and O&M contractors. Commissioned in May 2023, this project is the only on-grid power plant in Northeast Nigeria, with an annual generation capacity of 240,000MWh.
