= Karin Bohle-Lawrenz =

German politician (1957–2024)

Member of the Bürgerschaft of Bremen
- In office 2007–2011

Personal details
- Born: 26 November 1957 Bremen, West Germany
- Died: 15 May 2024 (aged 66) Bremen, Germany
- Party: SPD
- Education: Free University of Berlin; University of Bremen
- Occupation: Schoolteacher

Karin Bohle-Lawrenz (26 November 1957 – 15 May 2024) was a German schoolteacher and politician. A member of the Social Democratic Party, he served in the Bürgerschaft of Bremen from 2007 to 2011.

Bohle-Lawrenz died in Bremen on 15 May 2024, at the age of 66.
