= Peter Dusek =

Austrian historian (1945–2024)

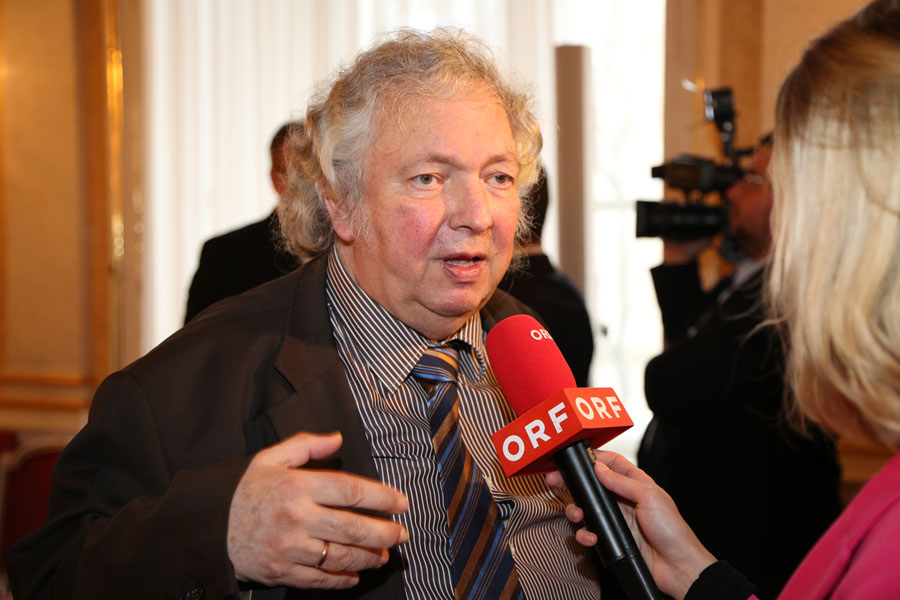
Image of Peter Dusek

Peter Dusek (20 May 1945 – 22 May 2024) was an Austrian historian, archivist and journalist. He was born in Waidhofen an der Thaya. Dusek died on 22 May 2024, at the age of 79.

== Awards and honors ==
- Förderungspreis der Stadt Vienna
- 1979: Österreichischer Staatspreis für Wissenschaftspublizistik
- Adolf-Schärf-Prize
- Silbernes Ehrenzeichen der Stadt Vienna
- 2003: Goldenes Ehrenzeichen der Stadt Vienna
- 2003: Professortitel, verliehen durch das Unterrichtsministerium
- 2006: Erasmus EuroMedia Medal
- 2008: Gottlob-Frick-Medal

== Selected publications ==
- Peter Dusek, Anton Pelinka, Erika Weinzierl (Hrsg.): Zeitgeschichte im Aufriss. Vienna/Munich 1988.
- Alltagsfaschismus in Österreich. St. Pölten 1979.
- Medienkoffer zur österreichischen Zeitgeschichte I–IV. Vienna 1980–1985.
- Elektra – Rache ohne Erlösung. Munich 1982.
- Oper live. Vienna 1987.
- Zeitzeugen; 1987. Vienna 1987.
- Kulissengespräche I. Vienna 1993.
- Kulissengespräche II. Vienna 1995.
- Leonie Rysanek – 40 Jahre Operngeschichte. Hamburg 1990.
