= Moorhead C. Kennedy Jr. =

American Foreign Service officer (1930–2024)

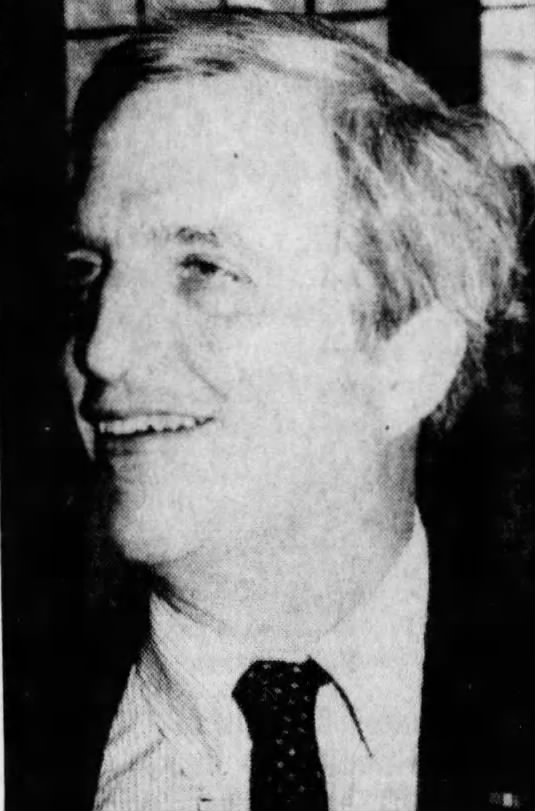
- Kennedy in 1985
- Born: Moorhead Cowell Kennedy Jr. November 5, 1930; Manhattan, New York, U.S.
- Died: May 3, 2024 (aged 93); Bar Harbor, Maine, U.S.
- Education: Princeton University; Harvard Law School
- Occupation: Foreign Service officer
- Spouse: Louisa Kennedy

Moorhead Cowell Kennedy Jr. (November 5, 1930 – May 3, 2024) was an American Foreign Service officer. He was one among 52 Americans held hostage for 444 days during the Iran hostage crisis.

== Life and career ==
Kennedy was born in Manhattan, New York, the son of Moorhead Cowell Kennedy Sr., a banker, and Anna Scott, a schoolteacher. He attended Princeton University, earning his bachelor's degree in oriental studies in 1952. After earning his degree, he attended Harvard Law School, graduating with a speciality in Islamic law in 1959.

In 1960, Kennedy joined the United States Foreign Service. Over the years working in the Foreign Service, he worked on assignments in Chile, Greece and Yemen, and was an economic officer in Lebanon from 1965 to 1969.

On November 4, 1979, while Kennedy was working on a temporary assignment for the Foreign Service in the American Embassy, the embassy was surrounded and taken over by Islamist militant students, following the Iranian Revolution. Kennedy was taken hostage along with 52 Americans, following 444 days of captivity. They were released on January 20, 1981, which after Kennedy returned home to the United States, he retired from the Foreign Service.

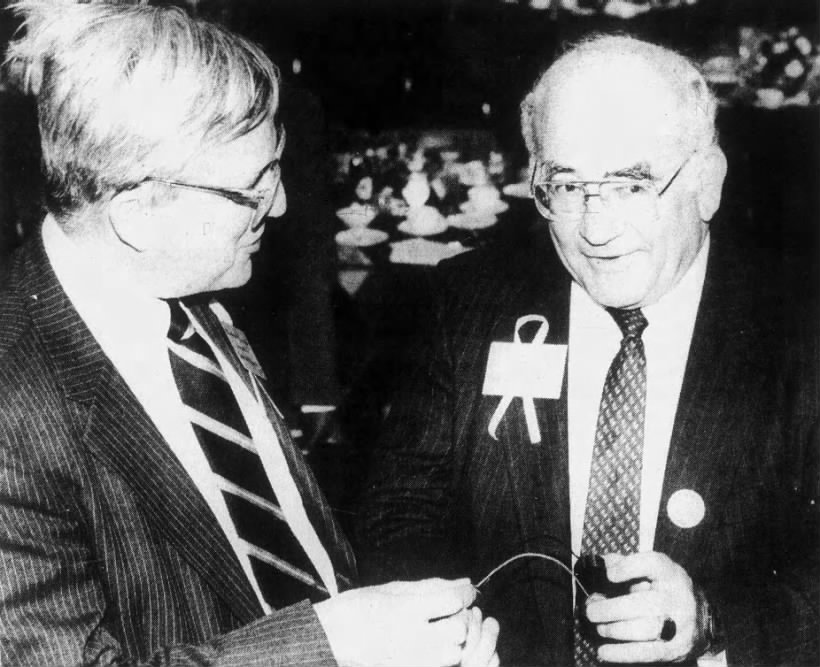
Kennedy (left) with Ed Asner, 1986

After retiring from the Foreign Service, Kennedy served as an executive director of Council for International Understanding until the late 1980s.

In 1991, Kennedy was awarded an honorary doctor of public service degree from North Adams State College.

== Death ==
Kennedy died on May 3, 2024, from complications of dementia at an assisted-living center in Bar Harbor, Maine, at the age of 93.
