= Vicente Fernández-Capel =

Spanish politician (1947/1948–2024)

Vicente Fernández-Capel (1947/1948 – 8 May 2024) was a Spanish politician and lawyer. He served in the Parliament of Andalusia from 1986 until 1990 as a member of the now defunct People's Democratic Party (PDP), which had allied with the People's Alliance (AP) and the former Liberal Party (PL) to form the regional government.

Fernández-Capel died on 8 May 2024 from multiple contusions sustained in an alleged assault by his son at their home. He was 77. His son was arrested on murder charges.
