= Bob Clifford (footballer) =

Australian rules footballer

Personal information
- Full name: Robert Clifford
- Born: 6 March 1937
- Died: 4 May 2024 (aged 87)
- Original team: Millicent
- Height: 185 cm (6 ft 1 in)
- Weight: 86 kg (190 lb)

Playing career^{1}
Years	Club	Games (Goals)
1958	Richmond	12 (1)
- ^{1} Playing statistics correct to the end of 1958.

Robert Clifford (6 March 1937 – 4 May 2024) was an Australian rules footballer who played with Richmond in the Victorian Football League (VFL).
