= John England (cricketer) =

New Zealand cricketer (1940–2024)

Personal information
- Full name: John Everest England
- Born: 1 June 1940; Christchurch, New Zealand
- Died: 22 May 2024 (aged 83); Christchurch, New Zealand
- Batting: Right-handed
- Role: Wicket-keeper

Domestic team information
- Years: Team
- 1958/59–1961/62: Canterbury
- Source: Cricinfo, 20 June 2024

John Everest England (1 June 1940 – 22 May 2024) was a New Zealand cricketer. He played in six first-class matches for Canterbury from 1958 to 1962.
