= Ana María Navarro =

Spanish academic (1929–2024)

- Born: 7 July 1929; Bilbao, Spain
- Died: 2 May 2024 (aged 94); Pamplona, Spain
- Occupation: Professor
- Known for: Academic

Ana María Navarro (7 July 1929 – 2 May 2024) was a Spanish academic. She was a professor at the University of Navarra from 1965 until her retirement in 1999.

== Biography ==
Navarro was born in Bilbao in 1929. Navarro was a professor at the University of Navarra. She joined the University of Navarra in 1965 as a scientific collaborator of the Institute of Educational Sciences (ICE), being a member of its first board of directors. In 1975 she was appointed director of programs at the ICE, a position she held until 1979. Navarro was a member of the teaching staff of this Institute and worked for the Educational Sciences section of the Faculty of Philosophy and Letters from 1975 until her retirement in 1999. She taught the subjects of Sociology of Education and Sociology of the Family. From 1970 to 1973, she was the Spanish delegate of the “International Federation of Parents and Educators” a consultative body of UNESCO.

She was the widow of the former professor emeritus Manuel Ferrer Regales. She was the mother of a large family. She died on 2 May 2024.
