= Eduardo Contreras Mella =

Chilean lawyer, journalist, and politician (1940–2024)

Member of the Chamber of Deputies of Chile
- In office 1973–1977

Personal details
- Born: Eduardo Francisco Contreras Mella; 7 February 1940; Chillán, Chile
- Died: 26 May 2024 (aged 84); Santiago, Chile
- Political party: PCCh
- Education: University of Havana
- Occupation: Lawyer; Journalist

Eduardo Francisco Contreras Mella (7 February 1940 – 26 May 2024) was a Chilean lawyer, journalist, and politician. A member of the Communist Party, he served in the Chamber of Deputies from 1973 to 1977.

Contreras died in Santiago on 26 May 2024, at the age of 84.
