= Emmanuel Hendrickx =

Belgian politician (1940–2024)

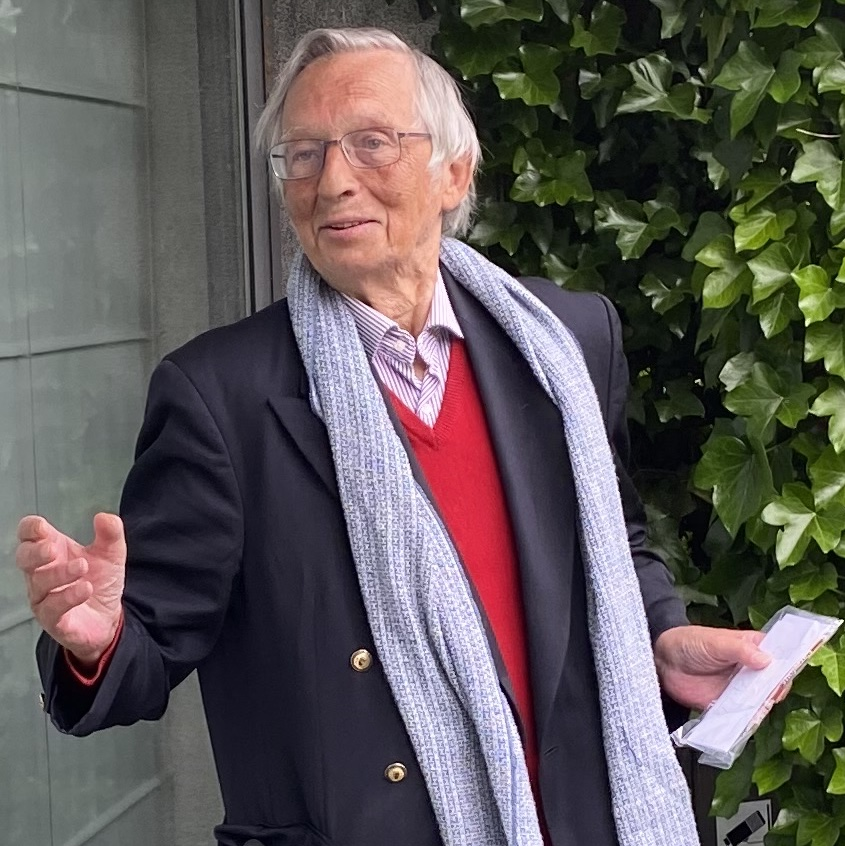

Governor of Walloon Brabant
- In office 2000–2006
- Preceded by: Valmy Féaux
- Succeeded by: Marie-José Laloy

Mayor of Braine-l'Alleud
- In office 1983–2000
- Preceded by: Emile Désirant
- Succeeded by: Claude Staumont

Personal details
- Born: 10 February 1940 Uccle, Belgium
- Died: 20 May 2024 (aged 84)
- Party: MR
- Occupation: Lawyer

Emmanuel Hendrickx (10 February 1940 – 20 May 2024) was a Belgian lawyer and politician of the Reformist Movement.

== Biography ==
Born in Uccle on 10 February 1940, Hendrickx served as échevin of Baine-l'Alleud from 1978 to 1982 before becoming mayor in 1983, serving until 2000. From 2000 to 2006, he was governor of Walloon Brabant.

Hendrickx died on 20 May 2024, at the age of 84.
