= Foivos Ioannidis =

Greek politician (1936–2024)

- Φοίβος Ιωαννίδης

Member of the Hellenic Parliament for Lasithi
- In office 18 June 1989 – 11 February 2004

Personal details
- Born: 14 March 1936 Sitia, Greece
- Died: 4 May 2024 (aged 88)
- Party: Pasok
- Education: National and Kapodistrian University of Athens
- Occupation: Lawyer

Foivos Ioannidis (Greek: Φοίβος Ιωαννίδης; 14 March 1936 – 4 May 2024) was a Greek lawyer and politician. A member of Pasok, he served in the Hellenic Parliament from 1989 to 2004.

Ioannidis died on 4 May 2024, at the age of 88.
