= Silvio Fazio =

Italian writer (1952–2024)

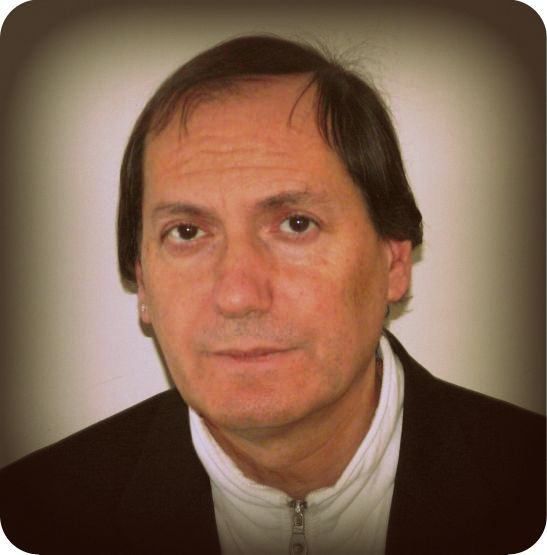
- Born: 9 April 1952; Rome, Italy
- Died: 9 May 2024 (aged 72); Nice, France
- Education: ITC Sandro Botticelli
- Occupation: Novelist
- Children: 2
- Writing career
- Language: Italian, French
- Genres: Thriller, fantasy, mystery, conspiracy

Silvio Fazio (9 April 1952 – 9 May 2024) was an Italian writer.

== Biography ==
Fazio was born in Rome, Italy on 9 April 1952. He graduated in accounting at the Institute Sandro Botticelli in Rome. He left Italy in 1977 to live in Nice, France. Before leaving Italy, being attracted by the animals of the savannah, he participated in the inauguration of the Safari Park in Rome, where he took care of 40 lions in semi-freedom. Fazio was the union representative for Force Ouvrière from 2002 to 2010. In 2002, he signed the agreement for a reduction in working hours for two hotels on the French Riviera.

In 2006, Silvio Fazio published his first science fiction novel: Il Segreto della grande porta. In 2010, he wrote the biography of Richard Ramirez, the Night Stalker, Il Profeta di Satana. In 2012, the author released Où les Dieux vont mourir (French), that challenges the official interpretation given by the FBI after the massacre at Columbine High School and in two documentary films, Bowling for Columbine (Michael Moore) and Elephant (Gus Van Sant). The author didn't like the society gossip column and he declined any International Book Fair that he considered not-literary conventions. Fazio wrote some short novels for anthologies for Perrone Publisher and, sometimes, he used pseudonyms. He wrote, also, articles for the Italian web log: Fronte della Comunicazione.

Fazio died on 9 May 2024, at the age of 72.

== Published works ==
=== Fiction ===
- 2006: Il segreto della grande porta (Aletti) ISBN 978-88-7680-155-6
- 2007: I labirinti di Zeus (Aletti) ISBN 978-88-7680-175-4
- 2007: Tra l'alba e il tramonto (Aletti) ISBN 978-88-7680-201-0
- 2007: La diligenza della verità (UniService) ISBN 978-88-6178-111-5
- 2007: L'antro del mai (Phasar) ISBN 978-88-87911-87-9
- 2008: Un grido nell'acqua (Boopen) ISBN 978-88-6223-160-2
- 2008: Beelzebul (Boopen) ISBN 978-88-6223-309-5
- 2008: Le torri del male (Boopen) ISBN 978-88-6223-472-6
- 2010: Il Profeta di Satana (Stampa Alternativa) ISBN 978-88-6222-130-6
- 2012: Où les Dieux vont mourir (Edilivre) ISBN 978-2-332-48304-1

=== Short Novels for Giulio Perrone Publisher ===
- 2008: La vita che vorrei ISBN 978-88-6316-037-6 pseudonym Silvio Rotti
- 2008: Vivo per lei ISBN 978-88-6316-040-6
- 2009: Sono nato un 9 aprile ISBN 978-88-6316-049-9 pseudonym Fabrizio Spampinato
- 2009: Lester ISBN 978-88-6316-050-5 pseudonym Claudio Nasica
- 2009: L'Isola del peccato ISBN 978-88-6316-054-3 pseudonym Massimo Russaiolo
- 2009: La carezza del male ISBN 978-88-6316-058-1
- 2009: La Bussola ISBN 978-88-6316-061-1
- 2009: Io un superbo? ISBN 978-88-6316-061-1 pseudonym Elena Spampinato
