= Franchino (disc jockey) =

Italian disc jockey and singer (1953–2024)

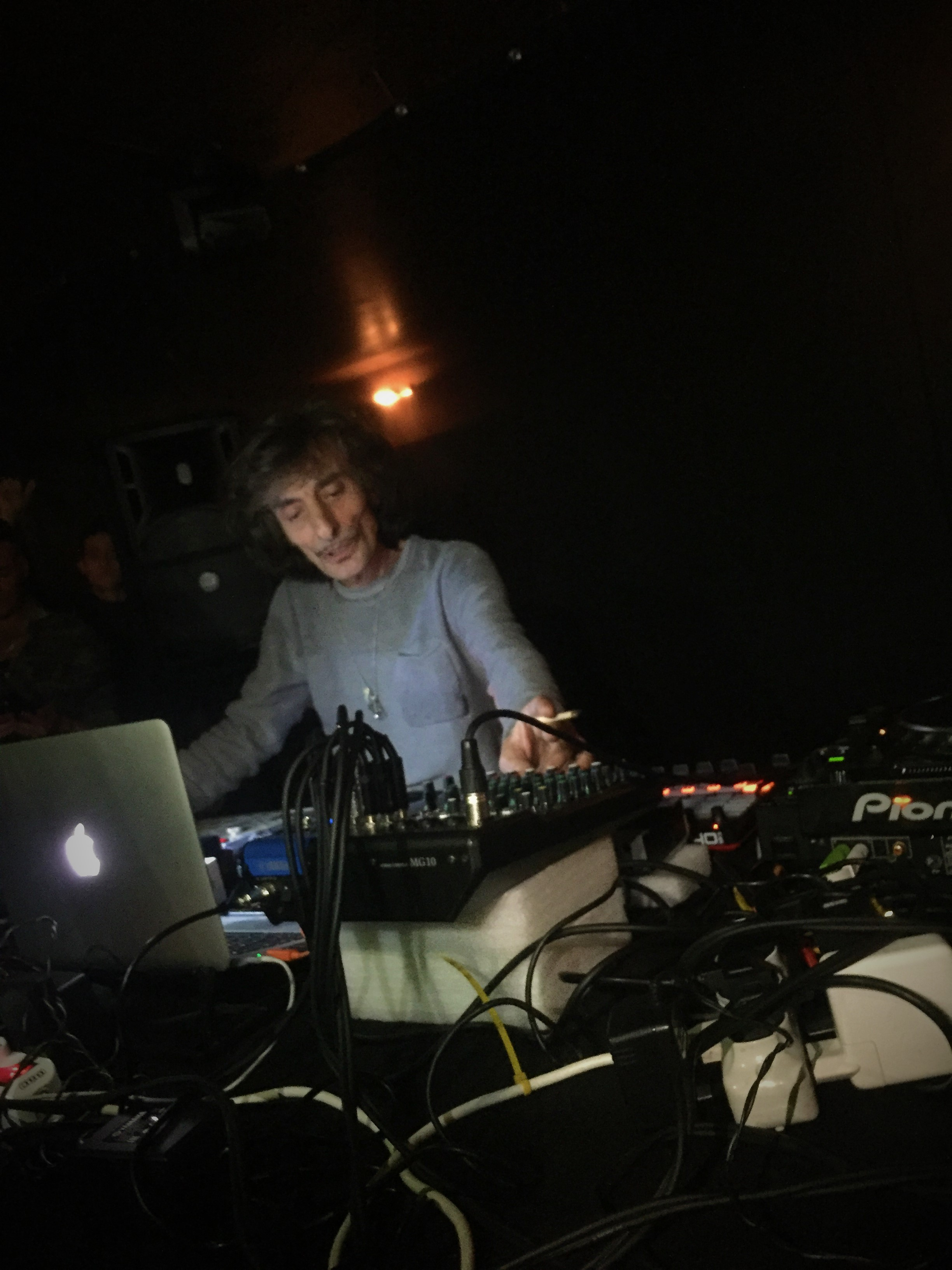
Franchino 2018

Francesco Principato (17 February 1953 – 19 May 2024), known professionally as Franchino was an Italian disc jockey. He died due to complications from a heart attack on 19 May 2024, at the age of 71.

== Discography ==
- 1993 – Escandalo Total (Franchino Is The Voice), with Andrea Giuditta (12", Interactive Test)
- 1994 – A Night in Tirrenia (12", Holy Moly Music)
- ? – Bambolina
- 1996 – EP (UMM)
- 1997 – Film A Cores (Cippiuppiù Records)
- 1998 – Elettronica (Underground (2))
- 1998 – Vamos (GFB Records)
- 1999 – 999 (Underground (2))
- 2000 – Calor (BXR)
- 2000 – Ogni Pensiero/È Controllo (BXR)
- 2001 – Magia Technologika (BXR)
- 2001 – Mosquito (Underground (2))
- 2001 – Psichoterapia (Underground (2))
- 2002 – Ficha No Caixa (BXR)
- 2002 – Take What You Wanna Take (Underground (2))
- 2003 – Maybe (Sacrifice)
- 2004 – Solidao (BXR)
- 2005 – Snowboard / Funky Music (come Principato), con Dariush (12", Ocean Dark)
- 2022 – C'era una volta (The Saifam Group - COM185)

=== Remix ===
- 1994 – Open Space Mix - Escandalo Totale (Sweet Revenge) – (Interactive Test)
- 2001 – Nukleuz In Ibiza 2001 - Silence (Franchino Mix) (Virgin)
- 2001 – Silence - Silence (Franchino Mix) (Nukleuz)

=== Mix ===
- 1999 – BXR Superclub Compilation Volume 1 (BXR)
- 2000 – BXR Superclub Compilation Volume 2 (BXR)

=== Album ===
- 2000 – Dedicated Followers Of Passion - 999 (Circa Records Ltd.)
- 2022 – C'era una volta (The Saifam Group - COM185)

=== Compilation ===
Songs featured in over 50 different titles from 1996 to 2008:

- 2008 – Metempsicosi 10 Years Of Electronic Music - 007 (Brusca Remix) (Trend Discotec)
- 2008 – Silea's Collection Autumn / Winter '09 - The Dolphin (Tip Fifth)
