= Frank Galle =

Australian rules footballer

Personal information
- Full name: Frank Galle
- Born: 13 December 1936
- Died: 21 May 2024 (aged 87)
- Original team: Kensington Socials
- Height: 187 cm (6 ft 2 in)
- Weight: 94 kg (207 lb)

Playing career^{1}
Years	Club	Games (Goals)
1958–60	North Melbourne	19 (2)
- ^{1} Playing statistics correct to the end of 1960.

Frank Galle (13 December 1936 – 21 May 2024) was an Australian rules footballer who played with North Melbourne in the Victorian Football League (VFL).
