= Raúl Sanz Jiménez =

Spanish businessman and politician (1949–2024)

Member of the Parliament of La Rioja
- In office 7 May 1983 – 26 January 1987

Personal details
- Born: 26 September 1949 Igea, Spain
- Died: 9 May 2024 (aged 74) Pamplona, Spain
- Party: PSOE La Rioja
- Occupation: Businessman

Raúl Sanz Jiménez (26 September 1949 – 9 May 2024) was a Spanish businessman and politician. A member of the Socialist Party of La Rioja, he served in the Parliament of La Rioja from 1983 to 1987.

Sanz died in Pamplona on 9 May 2024, at the age of 74.
