= Miriam Forman =

American astrophysicist (1939–2024)

- Born: 12 April 1939; San Francisco, California, U.S.
- Died: 2 May 2024 (aged 85)
- Education: Stony Brook University (PhD)
- Known for: Research and teaching in solar physics
- Scientific career
- Workplaces: NASA; Stony Brook University; American Physical Society

Miriam Ausman Forman (12 April 1939 – 2 May 2024) was an American astrophysicist known for her work on solar cosmic rays, turbulence and energy cascades in magnetohydrodynamics, and the solar wind.

== Education and career ==
Forman entered graduate study at Stony Brook University in 1968, completed her Ph.D. there in 1972, and remained affiliated with Stony Brook as an adjunct faculty member, supported by grants from NASA, until 1985. The grant encompassed her thesis in Cosmic Rays in Interplanetary Space. From 1991 to 1998, Forman managed the heliospheric section of the Science Division at NASA HQ in Washington DC.

She worked as an administrator for the American Physical Society from 1985 until 1991, when she joined the NASA Space Physics Division, and became program scientist for Heliospheric Missions at NASA. She stepped down from that position in 1998, and was seconded from NASA to the White House for a year, then returned in 1999 to Stony Brook as adjunct faculty again.

Forman died on May 2, 2024, at the age of 85.

== Recognition ==
In 1984 Forman was named a Fellow of the American Physical Society (APS), after nomination by the APS Division of Astrophysics, "for fundamental contributions to the theory of propagation and acceleration of energetic particles in the solar system and for application of the theory in the interpretation of observation". She was chair of the Division of Astrophysics for 1986–1987.

In 2002 she was named a Fellow of the American Association for the Advancement of Science "for research and teaching in astrophysics, especially solar physics, and for valuable service to professional societies and the government on behalf of science".
