= Park Myeong-seo =

South Korean politician (1938–2024)

Member of the National Assembly of South Korea
- In office 30 May 1992 – 29 May 1996

Personal details
- Born: 24 July 1938 Hampyeong County, Korea, Empire of Japan
- Died: 16 May 2024 (aged 85)
- Party: DP
- Education: Dongguk University; Chosun University

Park Myeong-seo (Korean: 박명서; 24 July 1938 – 16 May 2024) was a South Korean politician. A member of the Democratic Party he served in the National Assembly from 1992 to 1996.

Park died on 16 May 2024, at the age of 85.
