= Tapiwa Kumbuyani =

Zimbabwean footballer (1983–2024)

Personal information
- Date of birth: 8 February 1983
- Place of birth: Gweru, Zimbabwe
- Date of death: May 2024 (aged 41)
- Place of death: Gweru, Zimbabwe
- Height: 1.72 m (5 ft 8 in)
- Position: Defender

Senior career*
Years	Team	Apps	(Gls)
2003–2005	Chapungu United		
2006	Hwange		
2009	Monomotapa United		
2011	Blue Rangers		
2011–2014	CAPS United		
2015–2016	How Mine		
2017	Bantu Rovers		
2018	Chapungu United		

International career
2011–2012	Zimbabwe	7	(0)
- * Club domestic league appearances and goals

Tapiwa Kumbuyani (8 February 1983 – May 2024) was a Zimbabwean footballer who played as a defender. He died from liver cancer in Gweru, in May 2024, at the age of 41.
