= Henri Coupon =

French lawyer and novelist (1929–2024)

- Born: 5 October 1929
- Died: 9 May 2024 (aged 94)
- Occupations: Lawyer; Novelist

Henri Coupon (French: [ɑ̃ʁi kupɔ̃]; 5 October 1929 – 9 May 2024) was a French lawyer and novelist. In collaboration with Paul-Claude Innocenzi, he published a number of detective novels under the pseudonym Aramon.

== Biography ==
Born on 5 October 1929, Coupon studied law and became a lawyer, serving as Bâtonnier of the Avignon Bar. In the midst of the Algerian War, he defended many Algerians of the National Liberation Front during the transition from the French Fourth Republic to the Fifth. In 2001, he published Avocat des fellagas, 1958-1962 based on his experiences. He began his literary career writing detective novels under the name Aramon for Librairie des Champs-Élysées. His first detective novel written under his own name was titled Verdict in 1974, which was adapted into a film of the same name directed by André Cayatte. He then wrote scripts for the television series Les Dossiers de l'écran.

Coupon died on 9 May 2024, at the age of 94.

== Publications ==
=== Historical novels ===
- Le Grand Fléau (1978)
- La Croix et l'Épée (1980)
- Les Papes d'Avignon (1980)
- La Seconde Mort de Raspoutine (1984)
- Ces dinosaures dont la science ne veut pas (1998)
- Panique au Palais des Papes (2000)
- La Juive noire (2011)

=== Detective novels ===
==== Signed Henri Coupon ====
- Verdict (1974)
- La Pluie et le Beau Temps (1977)
- 21, rue de la Pente-Rapide (1997)
- T'as pas vu Poutine ? (2001)

==== Signed Aramon ====
- Carte blanche pour Mutti (1974)
- L'Ange de Noël (1975)
- Mourir pour une noix de coco (1975)
- Un tiercé pour la maffia (1975)
- Le Juge assassiné (1976)
- Les P. D. G. (1977)

=== Other publications ===
- Piège pour un flic (Propos du commissaire Javilliey recueillis par Aramon) (1975)
- Avocat des fellagas, 1958-1962 (2001)

== Filmography ==
=== Cinema ===
- Verdict (1974)
- Le Braconnier de Dieu (1983)

=== Television ===
- La Faute (1980)
- Les Avocats du diable (1981)
- Des yeux pour pleurer (1982)
