= Montserrat Casas =

Spanish Roman Catholic abbess (1933–2024)

Montserrat Casas i Soldevila (1933 – 16 May 2024) was a Spanish Catalan Roman Catholic Poor Clare nun, abbess of the Royal Monastery of Santa Maria de Pedralbes in Barcelona since 2013 until her death in 2024.

== Career ==
Casas was born in Alella, province of Barcelona, Spain, in 1933. She entered the Monastery of Pedralbes on 9 April 1955 as a postulant and in October of that year Casas began her novitiate. She took her first vows the following year, and on 8 December 1959 Casas made her solemn vow.

In the monastery she held various positions: procurator, seamstress, wardrobe keeper, gardener and cook. Through the culinary Fundació Alícia, Casas ensured the preservation of the recipe for mató de Pedralbes, which until then had been passed secretly from abbess to abbess for centuries since for reasons of age she could no longer make it in large quantities and kept it from being revealed to the general public.

The community elected Casas as abbess unanimously on 20 October 2013, receiving also the support of the vicar and abbess emerita Pierrette Prat i Galindo. She was re-elected until her death.

== Death ==
Casas died on early morning 16 May 2024, at the age of 90.
