= Winfried Fockenberg =

German politician (1945–2024)

Member of the Bundestag
- In office 20 December 1990 – 10 November 1994

Personal details
- Born: 15 January 1945 Bottrop, Gau Westphalia-North, Germany
- Died: 2 May 2024 (aged 79) Bottrop, North Rhine-Westphalia, Germany
- Party: CDU
- Occupation: Jurist

Winfried Fockenberg (15 January 1945 – 2 May 2024) was a German jurist and politician. A member of the Christian Democratic Union, he served in the Bundestag from 1990 to 1994.

Fockenberg died in Bottrop on 2 May 2024, at the age of 79.
