= Jean Emelina =

French academic and writer (1934–2024)

- Born: 16 April 1934; Malaussène, France
- Died: 8 May 2024 (aged 90); Nice, France
- Occupations: Professor; Writer

Jean Emelina (16 April 1934 – 8 May 2024) was a French academic and writer.

== Biography ==
Born in Malaussène on 16 April 1934, Emelina was a professor of literature at Côte d'Azur University. He specialized in 17th-century French literature, such as Molière and Jean Racine, writing books on his native area, as well as detective novels. He occasionally wrote under the pseudonym Michel Léman.

Emelina died in Nice on 8 May 2024, at the age of 90.

== Works ==
=== Under the name Michel Léman ===
- La Salle de bains (1971)
- La Vive saison (1975)
- Mathusalem le sanglier (1990)
- A Rebrousse poil (1991)

=== Under the name Jean Emelina ===
- Les Valets et les servantes dans le théâtre comique en France de 1610 à 1700 (1975)
- Edgar Poe et la raison visionnaire (1988)
- Le Comique. Essai d'interprétation générale (1991)
- Comédie et Tragédie (1998)
- Racine infiniment (1999)
- Les Chemins de la libido (2004)
- Les Mises en scène de Molière du xxe siècle à nos jours. Actes du 3e colloque international de Pézenas, 3-4 juin 2005 (2007)
- RDA mon amour (2019)
- Le Pays Niçois : Vies d’hier & d’aujourd’hui (2021)

=== Detective novels ===
- Samba niçoise (2013)
- Alerte à Coco Beach (2014)
- Cyanure à Valrose (2015)
- Ouragans sur la Côte (2016)
- Mystère à Isola 2000 (2018)
- Chienne d'enquête en Pays Niçois (2019)
- L’inconnue du Paillon (2022)
