= Karen Saribekyan =

Armenian technician and politician (1963–2024)

Member of the National Assembly of Armenia
- In office 12 May 2007 – 2 April 2017

Personal details
- Born: 10 December 1963 Kirovakan, Armenian SSR, USSR
- Died: 10 May 2024 (aged 60)
- Party: RPA
- Occupation: Technician

Karen Saribekyan (Armenian: Կարեն Սարիբեկյան; 10 December 1963 – 10 May 2024) was an Armenian technician and politician. A member of the Republican Party, he served in the National Assembly from 2007 to 2017.

Saribekyan died on 10 May 2024, at the age of 60.
