= Rubén Monasterios =

Venezuelan writer and theatre critic (1938–2024)

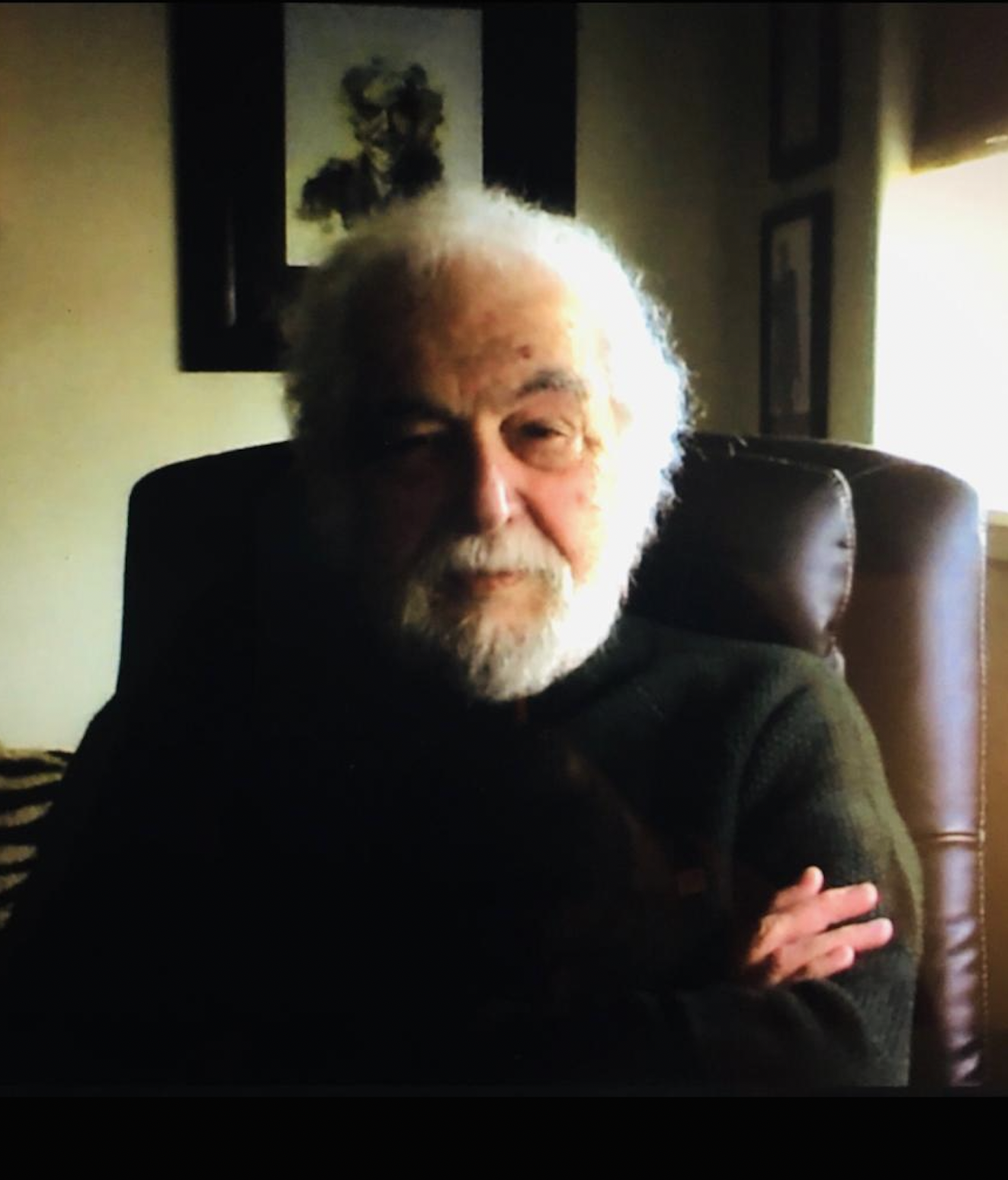
- Born: 21 January 1938; Maiquetía, Venezuela
- Died: 11 May 2024 (aged 86); Caracas, Venezuela
- Education: Central University of Venezuela
- Occupations: Writer; Theatre critic

Rubén Monasterios (21 January 1938 – 11 May 2024) was a Venezuelan writer and theatre critic.

== Biography ==
Born in Maiquetía on 21 January 1938, Monasterios earned a degree in social work and a master's degree in social psychology from the Central University of Venezuela. He taught at a number of schools, including the Lisbon Theatre and Film School and Andrés Bello Catholic University.

Rubén Monasterios died in Caracas on 11 May 2024, at the age of 86.
