= Susanne Page =

American photographer (1938–2024)

- Susanne Page in 2023
- Born: Susanne Calista Stone; March 3, 1938; Montclair, NJ
- Died: May 13, 2024 (aged 86); Alexandria, VA
- Known for: Photographs of Hopi and Diné people
- Style: documentary
- Spouse(s): Fred Anderson, Tom Truitt, Jake Page
- Children: 3 children, 3 step-children
- Parents: Charles Francis Stone III (father); Virginia Young Stone (mother)
- Website: susannepage.com

Susanne Page (March 3, 1938 – May 13, 2024) was an American photographer. She was best known for her photographs of Native Americans of the American southwest.

Page worked for the United States Information Agency for 40 years as a photographer. She died on May 13, 2024, at the age of 86.

== Work ==
Susanne Page created documentary photographs of the Hopi and Diné (Navajo) people going about their daily lives. In 1974, she was invited by Hopi elders to photograph the Hopi people and the plants and animals that sustain their way of life. The Hopi elders had seen her photographs of the Diné people which convinced them of her seriousness as a documentary photographer. Consequently she was the first photographer, since the early 20th century to be authorized by the tribe to do so.

Page's work has been exhibited and published widely. Fifty of her photographs are held in the permanent collection of the Smithsonian Institution's National Museum of the American Indian.

== Selected photographic books ==
- Song of the Earth Spirit, Photographs and text by Susanne Page, foreword by David Brower. Friends of the Earth, McGraw-Hill, Ballantine Books (1973) ISBN 9780913890264
- Hopi, photographs by Susanne Page, text by Jake Page. Harry Abrams Publisher, (1982), and Hopi, Twenty Fifth Anniversary Edition, redesign by Rio Nuevo Publishers. (2009) ISBN 9781933855264
- A Celebration of Being: Photographs of the Hopi and Navajo, photographs and text by Susanne Page, foreword by Robert Redford. Northland Publishing, (1989) ISBN 9780873584951
- Navajo, photographs by Susanne Page, text by Jake Page. Harry Abrams Publisher, (1995), and Navajo, redesign by Rio Nuevo Publishing (2010) ISBN 9781933855271
- Field Guide to Southwestern Indian Arts and Crafts, Photographs Susanne Page, text by Jake Page. Random House Publishing (1998) ISBN 9780679770275
- Indian Arts of the Southwest, Photographs by Susanne Page, text by Jake Page. Rio Nuevo Publishers, (2008) ISBN 9781933855172
