= Salim Haji Said =

Indonesian writer (1943–2024)

Salim Said
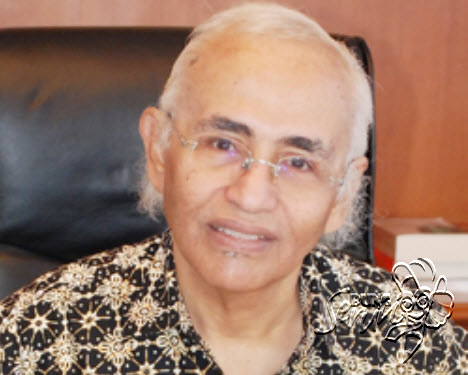

Indonesian Ambassador to Czech Republic
- In office 18 October 2006 – 10 August 2010
- President: Susilo Bambang Yudhoyono
- Preceded by: Santoso Rahardjo
- Succeeded by: Emeria Wilujeng Amir Siregar

Personal details
- Born: 10 November 1943 Amparita, Japanese-occupied Dutch East Indies
- Died: 18 May 2024 (aged 80) Jakarta, Indonesia
- Education: Universitas Indonesia; Ohio University; Ohio State University
- Occupation: Academician, lecturer, writer, journalist, diplomat

Salim Haji Said (10 November 1943 – 18 May 2024) was an Indonesian writer and journalist. He died in Jakarta on 18 May 2024, at the age of 80.

== Early life and education ==
Salim was born in a village named Amparita, an area that during the era of the Dutch East Indies was part of Parepare. He is the eldest son of Haji Said and Hajjah Salmah. He completed his primary education in Parepare and finished high school in Surakarta, Central Java. Salim pursued education at the Indonesian National Theater Academy (1964–1965), Faculty of Psychology at the University of Indonesia (1963–1968, not completed), graduated from the Sociology Department of the Faculty of Social and Political Sciences at the University of Indonesia (1977), and earned an M.A. from Ohio University (1980), as well as a PhD from Ohio State University, Columbus, United States (1985).

== Career ==
He has served as an editor for Pelopor Baru, Angkatan Bersenjata, and as an editor for Tempo magazine (1971–1987). Salim has also taught at the School of Social Sciences and was a member of the National Film Board. As a member of the National Film Board and the Jakarta Arts Council (DKJ), he often participated in discussions about film, history, and Indonesian social and political matters at both national and international levels.

Since 2000, Salim has been an extraordinary lecturer at Muhammadiyah University of Malang. In 2005, he was appointed as a professor at the Faculty of Social and Political Sciences at Muhammadiyah University of Malang.

His written works include Militer Indonesia dan Politik: Dulu, Kini, dan Kelak, Profil Dunia Film Indonesia, and many others. His writings on literature have been published in Mimbar Indonesia, Bahasa dan Budaya, Horison, Budaya Jaya, and others. Additionally, he has written extensively about film. His book on film is titled Profil Dunia Perfilman Indonesia (1982).
