= Komao Hayashi =

Japanese artist and dollmaker (1936–2024)

- 林 駒夫
- Born: 22 September 1936; Kyoto, Japan
- Died: 15 May 2024 (aged 87)
- Occupations: Artist; Dollmaker

Komao Hayashi (Japanese: 林 駒夫 Hayashi Komao; 22 September 1936 – 15 May 2024) was a Japanese artist and dollmaker.

== Biography ==
Born in Kyoto on 22 September 1936, Hayashi learned the trade of making traditional Japanese dolls with Menya Shōzō XII and Kitazawa Nyoi, a maker of Japanese theatre masks for Noh. He specialized in making dolls for Hinamatsuri, a religious holiday in Japan where decorative dolls are put on display. He was honored with the prize of the Japanese Society of Arts and Crafts in 1973. In 2002, he was named a Living National Treasure. In 2004, he was awarded the Purple Ribbon of the Medal of Honor.

Komao Hayashi died on 15 May 2024, at the age of 87.

== Expositions ==
- Miyabi no toki Hayashi Komao-ten (2007)
