= Isa Dongoyaro =

Nigerian politician

Federal Representative
- Constituency: Babura/Garki

Personal details
- Born: December 5, 1977
- Died: May 10, 2024 (aged 46)
- Occupation: Politician

Isa Dongoyaro (December 5, 1977 – May 10, 2024) was a Nigerian politician who served as the Federal Representative for the Babura/Garki constituency of Jigawa State in the 10th National Assembly. He died on May 10, 2024, at the age of 46.
