= Peter Morris (Australian footballer) =

Australian rules footballer

Personal information
- Full name: Peter Morris
- Born: 26 July 1933
- Died: 31 May 2024 (aged 90)
- Original team: Dandenong
- Height: 178 cm (5 ft 10 in)
- Weight: 73 kg (161 lb)
- Position: Centre / Forward

Playing career^{1}
Years	Club	Games (Goals)
1955–1960	Richmond	89 (103)
- ^{1} Playing statistics correct to the end of 1960.

Peter Morris (26 July 1933 – 31 May 2024) was an Australian rules footballer who played with Richmond in the Victorian Football League (VFL).
