= Janusz Mazurek =

Polish politician (1943–2024)

Member of the Senate of Poland
- In office 25 November 1991 – 31 May 1993

Personal details
- Born: Janusz Andrzej Mazurek; 25 October 1943 Niemienice, Gmina Krasnystaw, General Government
- Died: 23 May 2024 (aged 80)
- Party: KO "S"
- Education: Maria Curie-Skłodowska University
- Occupation: Lawyer

Janusz Andrzej Mazurek (25 October 1943 – 23 May 2024) was a Polish lawyer and politician. A member of the Solidarity Citizens' Committee, he served in the Senate from 1991 to 1993.

Mazurek died on 23 May 2024, at the age of 80.
