= Mathias Asoma Puozaa =

Ghanaian politician and educationist (1948–2024)

Hon. Mathias Asoma Puozaa

Member of Parliament for Nadowli East Constituency
- In office 7 January 2009 – 6 January 2013
- President: John Atta Mills; John Mahama

Member of Parliament for Nadowli East Constituency
- In office 7 January 2005 – 6 January 2009
- President: John Kufuor

Personal details
- Born: 10 January 1948 Touri-Daffiama, Northern Territories of the Gold Coast
- Died: 24 May 2024 (aged 76) Accra, Ghana
- Party: National Democratic Congress (Ghana)
- Education: University of Edinburgh
- Profession: Educationist, politician

Mathias Asoma Puozaa (10 January 1948 – 24 May 2024) was a Ghanaian politician and was the member of parliament for the Nadowli East constituency in the Upper West Region of Ghana.

== Early life and education ==
Puozaa was born on 10 January 1948. He hailed from Touri-Daffiama in the Upper West Region of Ghana. He attended the University of Edinburgh in Scotland. From that University he obtained a Master of Science in Community Education.

Puozaa became an educationist by profession.

== Politics ==
Puozaa was a member of the National Democratic Congress. He was elected as the member of parliament for the Nadowli East Constituency in the 2004 Ghanaian general elections. He represented the constituency in the 4th parliament of the 4th republic of Ghana from 7 January 2005 to 6 January 2009. He was elected with 6,095 votes out of 10,144 total valid votes cast. This was equivalent to 60.1% of the total valid votes cast. He was elected over Tingani Banoebara Jonas of the People's National Convention, Kasanga Raphael Kasim of the New Patriotic Party and Tiesaah Azaadong George of the Convention People's Party. These obtained 713 votes, 3,221 votes and 115 votes of the total valid votes cast. These were equivalent to 7.0%, 31.8% and 1.1% of the total valid votes cast.

== Personal life and death ==
Puozaa was a Christian. He died after a short illness at 37 Military Hospital, on 24 May 2024, at the age of 76.
