= Vladimir Kuznetsov (archaeologist) =

Russian archeologist and historian (1927–2024)

- Владимир Кузнецов
- Born: Vladimir Alexandrovich Kuznetsov; 25 July 1927; Pyatigorsk, North Caucasus Krai, Russian SFSR, USSR
- Died: 5 May 2024 (aged 96); Mineralnye Vody, Stavropol Krai, Russia
- Education: Pyatigorsk State University
- Occupations: Archeologist; Historian

Vladimir Alexandrovich Kuznetsov (Russian: Владимир Александрович Кузнецов; 25 July 1927 – 5 May 2024) was a Russian archaeologist and historian. He specialized in the history of the North Caucasus.

== Biography ==
Born in Pyatigorsk on 25 July 1927, Kuznetsov studied at Pyatigorsk State University, during which he took a trip to the Nizhny Arkhyz archaeological site. He went on to work for the Kabardino-Balkarian Institute for Humanitarian Research.

Kuznetsov died in Mineralnye Vody on 5 May 2024, at the age of 96.

== Publications ==
- Rekom, Nuzal i Tsarazonta (1990)
- Ocherki istorii alan (1992)
- Nizhnii Arkhyz v X-XII vekakh: K istorii srednevekovykh gorodov severnogo Kavkaza (1993)
- Les chrétiens disparus du Caucase: Histoire et archéologie du christianisme au Caucase du Nord et en Crimée (1999)
- Les Alains : Cavaliers des steppes, seigneurs du Caucase, Ier - XVe siècles apr. J.-C. (2005)
- Istoriia V Zerkale Paranauki : Kritika Sovremennoi etnotsentristskoi Istoriografii Severnogo Kavkaza (2006)
