= Mary O'Rourke (barrister) =

Irish barrister

Mary O'Rourke QC was an Irish barrister and one of the United Kingdom's leading medical law barristers, having handled several high-profile cases in this area. Called to the Bar in 1981, she was appointed Queen's Counsel in 2009.

Mary O'Rourke attended King's College London 1977–1980, graduating with an LL.B 1st Class Honours. She attended Inns of Court School of Law 1980–1981 and was called to the Bar that year. From 1981 to 1982 she attended the College of Europe (Johan Willem Beyen promotion) in Bruges, Belgium, graduating with a master's degree (Certificat de Hautes Études Européennes) in European law. She was called to the Bar in Northern Ireland in 2003. She was awarded the Professional Discipline Junior of the Year Award at the Chambers & Partners Bar Awards in 2008.

She represented Dr Al-Zayyat in his widely publicized case.

On Tuesday 28 May 2024, her former Chambers, Deans Court Chambers, announced that Mary O’Rourke KC had died in her home city of Belfast.
