= Ewa Sikorska-Trela =

Polish trade unionist and politician (1943–2024)

Member of the Sejm
- In office 20 October 1997 – 18 October 2001

Personal details
- Born: 2 January 1943 Siedlce, General Government
- Died: 20 May 2024 (aged 81)
- Party: AWS
- Education: Higher School of Pedagogy in Gdańsk
- Occupation: Trade unionist

Ewa Sikorska-Trela (2 January 1943 – 20 May 2024) was a Polish trade unionist and politician. A member of Solidarity Electoral Action, she served in the Sejm from 1997 to 2001.

Sikorska-Trela died on 20 May 2024, at the age of 81.
