= Syed Mumtaz Ali Shah =

Pakistani actor (1933–2024)

- سید ممتاز علی شاہ
- Born: 11 March 1933; Spina Warae, Peshawar, North-West Frontier Province, British India
- Died: 31 May 2024 (aged 91); Peshawar, Khyber Pakhtunkhwa, Pakistan
- Occupation: Actor
- Awards: Pride of Performance

Syed Mumtaz Ali Shah (Urdu: سید ممتاز علی شاہ; 11 March 1933 – 31 May 2024) was a Pakistani actor who worked in many Pashto dramas.

== Life and career ==
Shah was born on 11 March 1933. He matriculated in 1948 at the Islamia Collegiate School, Peshawar. He served as a refugee village administrator in the commissionerate for Afghan refugees. He was attached to Radio Pakistan since 1948. He participated in the inaugural drama on Pakistan Television, namely Chaklala, in 1969.

In interviews he related the story of his first participation in a radio drama. He had just two lines in the drama about passing a pipe (chelam) to an elder.

Shah died on 31 May 2024, at the age of 91.

== Videography ==
Serial	Channel	Language	Year
Namoos	PTV	Pashto & Urdu	
Sahar	Radio Pakistan	Pashto	
Teendak		Pashto	
Chagha		Pashto	
Janan	PTV	Pashto	
Zanjeerayn		Urdu	
Rokhana Teare		Pashto	
Shor		Pashto	
Patkay		Pashto	
Wrake Laare		Pashto	
Kaglechuna	AVT Khyber	Pashto	2013
