= Gebhard Halder =

Austrian politician (1942–2024)

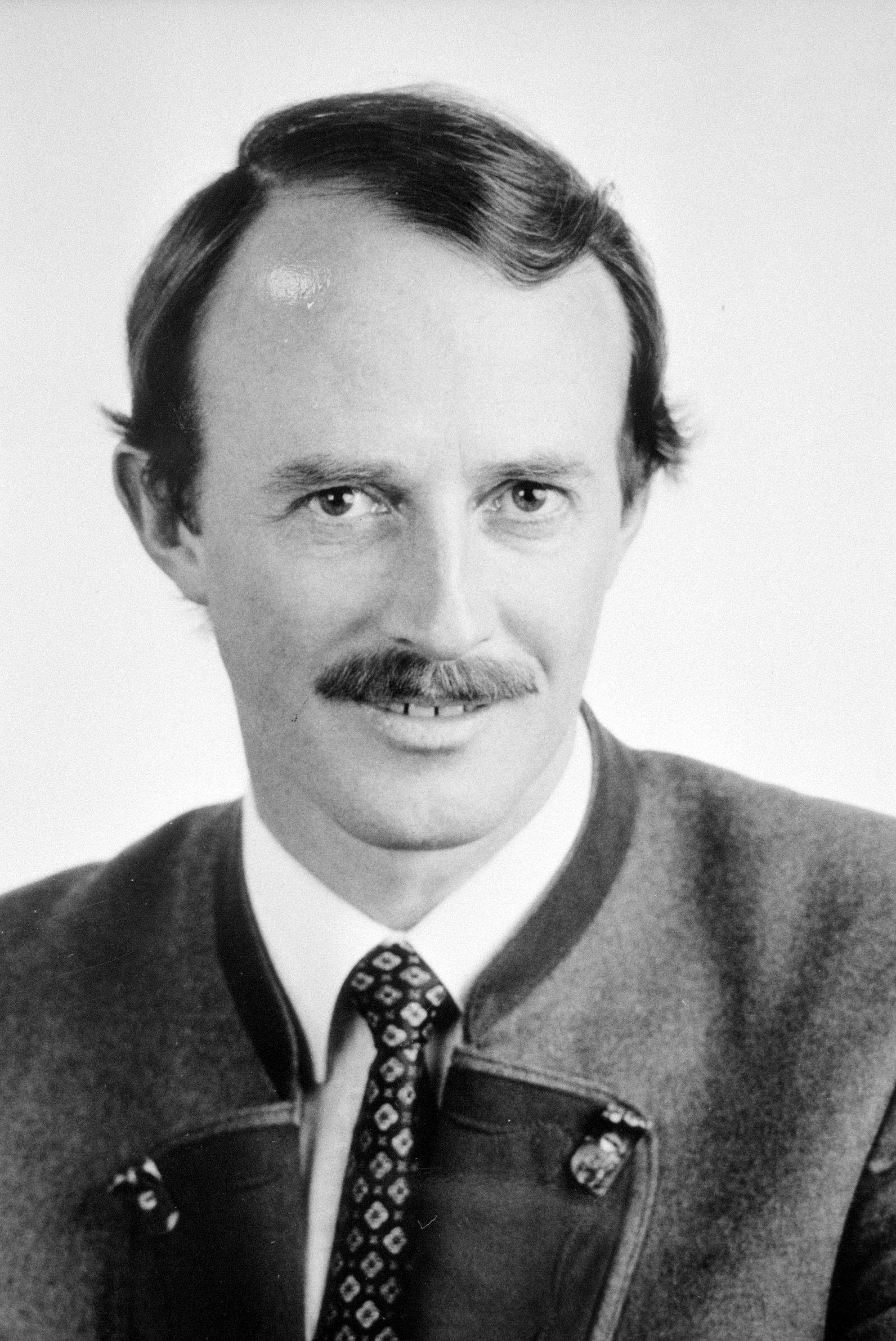
- Halder in 1987

President of the Landtag of Vorarlberg
- In office 5 October 2004 – 13 October 2009
- Preceded by: Manfred Dörler
- Succeeded by: Bernadette Mennel

Personal details
- Born: 17 August 1942 Bregenz, Reichsgau Tirol-Vorarlberg, Germany
- Died: 20 May 2024 (aged 81) Feldkirch, Vorarlberg, Austria
- Party: ÖVP
- Education: Bäuerliches Schul- und Bildungszentrum für Vorarlberg
- Occupation: Farmer

Gebhard Halder (17 August 1942 – 20 May 2024) was an Austrian farmer and politician. A member of the Austrian People's Party, he served as president of the Landtag of Vorarlberg from 2004 to 2009.

Halder died in Feldkirch on 20 May 2024, at the age of 81.
