= Florence Minor =

American writer and film editor (1949–2024)

- Born: Florence Friedmann; October 22, 1949; The Bronx, New York, U.S.
- Died: May 21, 2024 (aged 74); Washington, Connecticut, U.S.
- Occupations: Children's book author, film editor

Florence J. Friedmann Minor (October 22, 1949 – May 21, 2024) was an American children's book author and film editor. Her picture book If You Were a Penguin, illustrated by her husband Wendell Minor, was selected for wide distribution in 2009, through Pennsylvania's "One Book, Every Young Child" project.

== Early life and education ==
Friedmann was born in the Bronx, the daughter of Richard Friedmann and Etta L. Friedmann. Her father was a chiropractor, born in Hungary; her mother was an administrative assistant at Lehman College. She graduated from Hunter College.

== Career ==
Minor was a documentary film editor for ABC News, based in New York. Beginning in the 1990s, she had a second career writing children's books with her husband, illustrator Wendell Minor, and managing his art studio. The couple won the New England Independent Booksellers Association (NEIBA) President's Award, and were honored as "Literary Lights" by the Associates of the Boston Public Library. In 2009, their book If You Were a Penguin was chosen for Pennsylvania's "One Book, Every Young Child" project, and the pair toured in Pennsylvania, speaking to children at libraries. They also presented awards to public libraries for innovation in early literacy programming. They were speakers at the Connecticut Children's Book Fair in 2005, 2006, 2009, and 2014.

== Publications ==
- Wendell Minor: Art for the Written Word (1995, co-editor)
- Christmas Tree! (2005, illustrated by Wendell Minor)
- If You Were a Penguin (2009, illustrated by Wendell Minor)
- If You Were a Panda Bear (2013, illustrated by Wendell Minor)
- How to be a Bigger Bunny (2017, illustrated by Wendell Minor)
- Smitten with Kittens (2022, illustrated by Wendell Minor)

== Personal life ==
Friedmann married Wendell Minor in 1978. She died from ovarian cancer in 2024, at the age of 74, in Washington, Connecticut.
