= Dick Kuiper =

Dutch academic and politician (1938–2024)

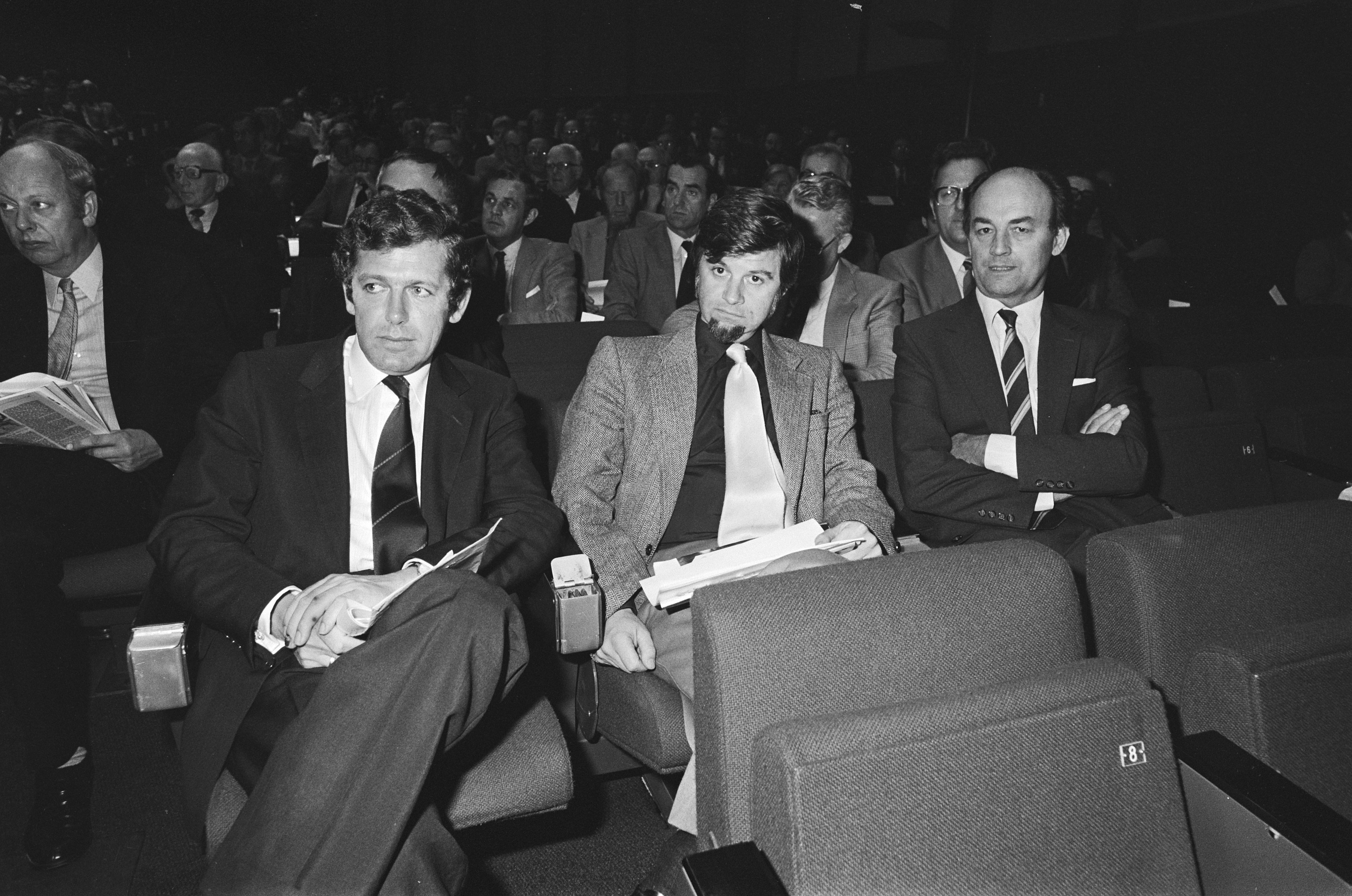
- Kuiper (center) in 1980

Member of the Senate of the Netherlands
- In office 13 September 1983 – 13 June 1995

Personal details
- Born: Dirk Theodoor Kuiper; 25 December 1938 Amsterdam, Netherlands
- Died: 19 May 2024 (aged 85) Amsterdam, Netherlands
- Party: CDA
- Education: Vrije Universiteit Amsterdam
- Occupation: Academic

Dirk Theodoor "Dick" Kuiper (25 December 1938 – 19 May 2024) was a Dutch academic and politician. A member of the Christian Democratic Appeal, he served in the Senate from 1983 to 1995.

Kuiper died in Amsterdam on 19 May 2024, at the age of 85.
