= Terry Robards =

American wine critic (1939–2024)

Terry Robards (October 7, 1939 – May 23, 2024) was an American wine critic. He was the wine critic for The New York Times, The New York Post, and a senior editor for Wine Spectator.

== Books ==
- New York Times Book of Wine (1976)
- California Wine Label Album (1981)
- Terry Robards New Book of Wine (1984)
