= Harry John Roland =

American orator (1954–2024)

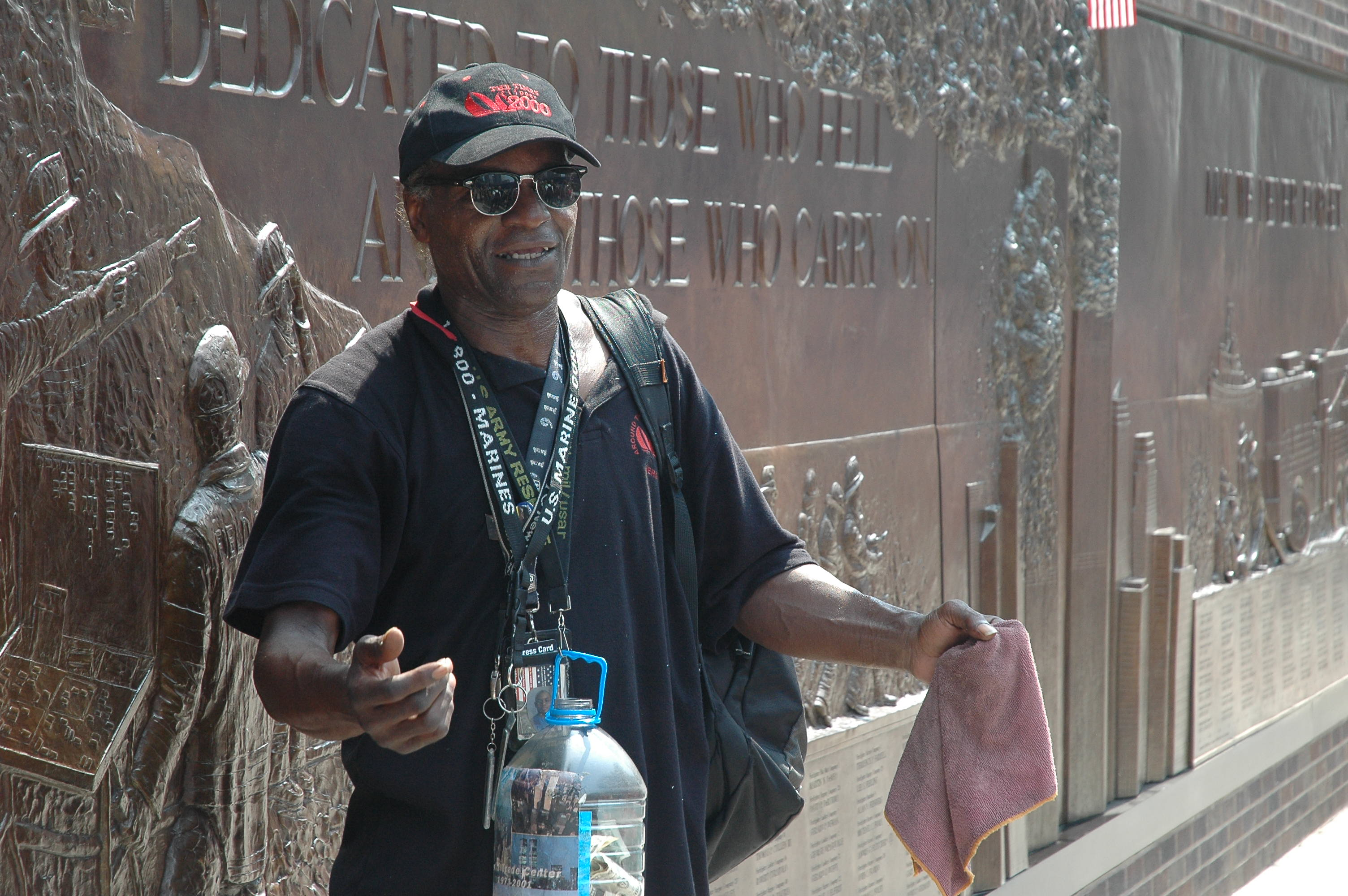
- Roland in 2011
- Born: May 14, 1954; Harlem, New York, U.S.
- Died: May 23, 2024 (aged 70); Upper Manhattan, New York, U.S.
- Occupation: Orator

Harry John Roland (May 14, 1954 – May 23, 2024), also known as The World Trade Center Man, was an American orator. He became well known to the American public after reflecting on the September 11 attacks, spending most of his days near the World Trade Center site for the rest of his life.

== Life and career ==
Roland was born in Harlem, New York, the son of Harry Roland Sr. and Marie Bowen, a bartender. He was a freelance photographer and security guard.

After the September 11 attacks, Roland spent most of his days near the World Trade Center site for the rest of his life, lecturing tourists on facts and figures about the terrorist attack.

== Death ==
Roland died on May 23, 2024 of a heart attack, at his home in Upper Manhattan, New York, at the age of 70.
