= 2024 in film =

2024 in film is an overview of events, including the highest-grossing films, award ceremonies, critics' lists of the best films of 2024, festivals, a list of country-specific lists of films released, and movie programming. Columbia Pictures and Metro-Goldwyn-Mayer (MGM) celebrated their 100th anniversaries; Toei Company celebrated its 75th anniversary; DreamWorks Pictures and DreamWorks Animation celebrated their 30th anniversaries; and the first Mickey Mouse films, including Steamboat Willie (1928), entered the public domain this year. Three of the films, Inside Out 2, Deadpool & Wolverine, and Moana 2 made $1 billion in 2024.

Alongside new releases, multiple popular films like The Lion King (1994), Les Misérables (2012), Alien (1979), Star Wars: Episode I – The Phantom Menace (1999), The Mummy (1999 film), Whiplash (2014), The Texas Chain Saw Massacre (1974), Shrek 2 (2004), Twister (1996), Saw (2004), Coraline (2009), The Nightmare Before Christmas (1993), Hocus Pocus (1993), Interstellar (2014), and Tenet (2020) were re-released to either celebrate their anniversaries and/or fill in the gaps left by films that had their original release dates affected by the 2023 Hollywood labor disputes. These disputes, including the Writers Guild of America strike and SAG-AFTRA strike, had a significant impact on the 2024 release schedule, with many films being postponed due to productions being halted mid-filming or before commencement.

== Highest-grossing films ==
Highest-grossing films of 2024
Rank	Title	Distributor	Worldwide gross
1	Inside Out 2	Disney	$1,698,863,816
2	Deadpool & Wolverine	Disney	$1,338,073,645
3	Moana 2	Disney	$1,059,242,164
4	Despicable Me 4	Universal	$972,021,410
5	Wicked	Universal	$758,729,195
6	Mufasa: The Lion King	Disney	$723,060,982
7	Dune: Part Two	Warner Bros.	$715,409,065
8	Godzilla x Kong: The New Empire	Warner Bros.	$572,505,338
9	Kung Fu Panda 4	Universal	$547,689,492
10	Sonic the Hedgehog 3	Paramount	$492,162,604

=== Box office records ===
- Inside Out 2 surpassed The Lion King to become the highest-grossing animated film of all time and became the 8th highest grossing film of all time upon its release.
  - Inside Out 2 became the 54th film to gross $1 billion worldwide and the 12th animated film to do so.
  - It became the fastest animated film to gross $1 billion worldwide.
  - The Inside Out film series grossed over $2.5 billion with the release of Inside Out 2.
- Deadpool & Wolverine became the 55th film to gross $1 billion worldwide.
  - It had the highest-grossing opening weekend ever for an R-rated film.
  - It surpassed Joker (2019) as the highest-grossing R-rated film of all time.
  - It is the eleventh MCU film to gross over $1 billion, and the first since Spider-Man: No Way Home (2021).
  - It is the second R-rated film to gross over $1 billion, and the first since Joker (2019).
  - The Marvel Cinematic Universe became the first film franchise to gross $30 and $31 billion with the release of Deadpool & Wolverine.
- Moana 2 became the 56th film and the 13th animated film to gross $1 billion worldwide.
  - The Moana film series grossed over $1.5 billion with the release of Moana 2.
- The Despicable Me film franchise became the first animated film series to gross $5 billion with the release of Despicable Me 4.
- Wicked, the first installment in the musical's two-part adaptation, became the highest-grossing film based on a work set in the Land of Oz.
  - It became the first musical film to gross over $164 million worldwide on its opening weekend, making it the highest opening worldwide gross for a film based on a stage musical since Les Misérables (2012).
  - It surpassed Mamma Mia! (2008) as the highest-grossing Broadway musical film adaptation of all time.
- The Lion King film franchise grossed over $3 billion with the release of Mufasa: The Lion King.
- The Dune film series grossed over $1 billion with the release of Dune: Part Two.
- The Monsterverse film franchise grossed over $2.5 billion with the release of Godzilla x Kong: The New Empire.
- The Kung Fu Panda film series grossed over $2 billion with the release of Kung Fu Panda 4.
- The Sonic the Hedgehog film series grossed over $1 billion with the release of Sonic the Hedgehog 3.
- Sony's Spider-Man Universe grossed over $2 billion with the release of Venom: The Last Dance.
- The Bad Boys film series grossed over $1 billion with the release of Bad Boys: Ride or Die.

=== Studio records ===
- Inside Out 2 became the highest-grossing Pixar film of all time, surpassing Incredibles 2 (2018).
  - With the release of Inside Out 2, Pixar became the first animation studio to produce five films that grossed $1 billion.
- Deadpool & Wolverine became the highest-grossing R-rated Disney film, surpassing the 34-year-old record set by Pretty Woman in 1990.

=== Other records ===
- Deadpool & Wolverine became the most viewed trailer of all time until being surpassed by Spider-Man: Brand New Day (2026).
- Wicked became the best PG-rated first-day ticket pre-seller of the year and the number 3 best PG-rated first-day ticket pre-seller of all time, behind Frozen 2 and The Lion King (both 2019).
- Terrifier 3 became the highest-grossing unrated film of all time.
- 2024 is the first year since 2019 in which the top ten highest-grossing films worldwide were entirely Hollywood productions.

== Events ==
=== Award ceremonies ===
Date	Event	Host	Location(s)	Ref.
January 6	7th Astra Film Awards	Hollywood Creative Alliance	Los Angeles, California, U.S.	
January 7	81st Golden Globe Awards	Golden Globes, LLC	Beverly Hills, California, U.S.	
January 14	29th Critics' Choice Awards	Critics Choice Association	Santa Monica, California, U.S.	
January 26	11th Feroz Awards	Asociación de Informadores Cinematográficos de España	Madrid, Spain	
January 27–28	69th Filmfare Awards	The Times Group	GIFT City, India	
February 3	3rd Carmen Awards	Academia del Cine de Andalucía	Huelva, Andalusia, Spain	
February 4	16th Gaudí Awards	Catalan Film Academy	Barcelona, Catalonia, Spain	
February 4	51st Saturn Awards	Academy of Science Fiction, Fantasy and Horror Films	Los Angeles, California, U.S.	
February 9	2024 Movieguide Awards	Movieguide	Los Angeles, California, U.S.	
February 10	13th AACTA Awards	Australian Academy of Cinema and Television Arts	Gold Coast, Queensland, Australia	
February 10	13th AACTA International Awards	Australian Academy of Cinema and Television Arts	Gold Coast, Queensland, Australia	
February 10	38th Goya Awards	Academy of Cinematographic Arts and Sciences of Spain	Valladolid, Castile and León, Spain	
February 10	76th Directors Guild of America Awards	Directors Guild of America	Los Angeles, California, U.S.	
February 17	51st Annie Awards	ASIFA-Hollywood	Los Angeles, California, U.S.	
February 18	77th British Academy Film Awards	British Academy of Film and Television Arts	London, England, UK	
February 18	49th People's Choice Awards	People's Choice Awards	Santa Monica, California, U.S.	
February 24	49th César Awards	Académie des Arts et Techniques du Cinéma	Paris, France	
February 24	30th Screen Actors Guild Awards	SAG-AFTRA	Los Angeles, California, U.S.	
February 25	39th Independent Spirit Awards	Independent Spirit Awards	Santa Monica, California, U.S.	
February 25	35th Producers Guild of America Awards	Producers Guild of America	Los Angeles, California, U.S.	
February 26	2nd Astra Film Creative Arts Award	Hollywood Creative Alliance	Los Angeles, California, U.S.	
March 8	47th Japan Academy Film Prize	Japan Academy Film Prize Association	Tokyo, Japan	
March 9	44th Golden Raspberry Awards	Golden Raspberry Awards Foundation	Los Angeles, California, U.S.	
March 10	96th Academy Awards	Academy of Motion Picture Arts and Sciences	Los Angeles, California, U.S.	
March 11	32nd Actors and Actresses Union Awards	Actors and Actresses Union	Madrid, Spain	
April 14	76th Writers Guild of America Awards	Writers Guild of America, East; Writers Guild of America West	Los Angeles, California, U.S.	
April 20	11th Platino Awards	EGEDA, FIPCA	Riviera Maya, Quintana Roo, Mexico	
May 3	69th David di Donatello	Accademia del Cinema Italiano	Rome, Italy	
May 26–31	12th Canadian Screen Awards	Academy of Canadian Cinema & Television	Toronto, Ontario, Canada	
August 26	18th Sur Awards	Argentine Academy of Cinematography Arts and Sciences	Buenos Aires, Argentina	
September 7	66th Ariel Awards	Academia Mexicana de Artes y Ciencias Cinematográficas	Guadalajara, Jalisco, Mexico	
September 28	24th International Indian Film Academy Awards	International Indian Film Academy	Abu Dhabi, United Arab Emirates	
November 3	12th Macondo Awards	Colombian Academy of Cinematography Arts and Sciences	Bucaramanga, Santander, Colombia	
December 7	37th European Film Awards	European Film Academy	Lucerne, Switzerland	
December 8	8th Astra Film Awards	Hollywood Creative Alliance	Los Angeles, California, U.S.	
December 8	British Independent Film Awards 2024	BIFA	London, England, UK	
December 14	30th Forqué Awards	EGEDA	Madrid, Spain	

=== Film festivals ===
Date	Event	Host	Location(s)	Ref.
January 18 – 28	2024 Sundance Film Festival	Sundance Film Festival	Park City, Utah, United States	
January 25 – February 4	53rd International Film Festival Rotterdam	International Film Festival Rotterdam	Rotterdam, Netherlands	
February 7 – 17	39th Santa Barbara International Film Festival	Santa Barbara International Film Festival	Santa Barbara, California, United States	
February 15 – 25	74th Berlin International Film Festival	Berlin International Film Festival	Berlin, Germany	
February 20 – 24	13th Oceanside International Film Festival	Oceanside International Film Festival	Oceanside, California, United States	
March 1 – 10	27th Málaga Film Festival	Málaga Film Festival	Málaga, Spain	
May 9 – 19	2024 Seattle International Film Festival	Seattle International Film Festival	Seattle, Washington, United States	
May 14 – 25	2024 Cannes Film Festival	Cannes Film Festival	Cannes, France	
June 7 – 15	39th Guadalajara International Film Festival	Guadalajara International Film Festival	Guadalajara, Mexico	
June 9 – 15	2024 Annecy International Animation Film Festival	Annecy International Animation Film Festival	Annecy, France	
June 14 – 23	26th Shanghai International Film Festival	Shanghai International Film Festival	Shanghai, China	
June 28 – July 6	58th Karlovy Vary International Film Festival	Karlovy Vary International Film Festival	Karlovy Vary, Czech Republic	
August 7 – 17	77th Locarno Film Festival	Locarno Film Festival	Locarno, Switzerland	
August 16 – 23	30th Sarajevo Film Festival	Sarajevo Film Festival	Sarajevo, Bosnia & Herzegovina	
August 28 – September 7	81st Venice International Film Festival	Venice Film Festival	Venice, Italy	
September 5 – 15	2024 Toronto International Film Festival	Toronto International Film Festival	Toronto, Ontario, Canada	
September 11 – 18	2024 Atlantic International Film Festival	Atlantic International Film Festival	Halifax, Nova Scotia, Canada	
September 14 – 22	2024 Cinéfest Sudbury International Film Festival	Cinéfest Sudbury International Film Festival	Sudbury, Ontario, Canada	
September 20 – 28	72nd San Sebastián International Film Festival	San Sebastián International Film Festival	San Sebastián, Spain	
September 26 – October 6	43rd Vancouver International Film Festival	Vancouver International Film Festival	Vancouver, British Columbia, Canada	
September 27 – October 14	2024 New York Film Festival	New York Film Festival	New York City, United States	
October 2 – 11	29th Busan International Film Festival	Busan International Film Festival	Busan, South Korea	
October 3 – 13	57th Sitges Film Festival	Sitges Film Festival	Sitges, Spain	
October 9 – 20	2024 BFI London Film Festival	BFI London Film Festival	London, United Kingdom	
October 16 – 27	19th Rome Film Festival	Rome Film Festival	Rome, Italy	
October 16 – 27	60th Chicago International Film Festival	Chicago International Film Festival	Chicago, United States	
October 18 – 26	69th Valladolid International Film Festival	Valladolid International Film Festival	Valladolid, Spain	
October 24 – November 1	2024 El Gouna Film Festival	El Gouna Film Festival	El Gouna, Egypt	
October 28 – November 6	37th Tokyo International Film Festival	Tokyo International Film Festival	Tokyo, Japan	
November 20 – 28	55th International Film Festival of India	Directorate of Film Festivals	Goa, India	

== Awards ==
Category	82nd Golden Globe Awards January 5, 2025		30th Critics' Choice Awards February 7, 2025	78th BAFTA Awards February 16, 2025	Producers, Directors, Screen Actors, and Writers Guild Awards February 8 - 23, 2025	97th Academy Awards March 2, 2025
Category	Drama	Musical or Comedy	30th Critics' Choice Awards February 7, 2025	78th BAFTA Awards February 16, 2025	Producers, Directors, Screen Actors, and Writers Guild Awards February 8 - 23, 2025	97th Academy Awards March 2, 2025
Best Picture	The Brutalist	Emilia Pérez	Anora	Conclave	Anora	
Best Director	Brady Corbet; The Brutalist		Jon M. Chu; Wicked	Brady Corbet; The Brutalist	Sean Baker; Anora	
Best Actor	Adrien Brody; The Brutalist	Sebastian Stan; A Different Man	Adrien Brody; The Brutalist		Timothée Chalamet; A Complete Unknown	Adrien Brody; The Brutalist
Best Actress	Fernanda Torres; I'm Still Here	Demi Moore; The Substance		Mikey Madison; Anora	Demi Moore; The Substance	Mikey Madison; Anora
Best Supporting Actor	Kieran Culkin; A Real Pain					
Best Supporting Actress	Zoe Saldaña; Emilia Pérez					
Best Screenplay, Adapted	Peter Straughan; Conclave		Peter Straughan; Conclave		RaMell Ross & Joslyn Barnes; Nickel Boys	Peter Straughan; Conclave
Best Screenplay, Original	Peter Straughan; Conclave		Coralie Fargeat; The Substance	Jesse Eisenberg; A Real Pain	Sean Baker; Anora	
Best Animated Film	Flow		The Wild Robot	Wallace & Gromit: Vengeance Most Fowl	The Wild Robot	Flow
Best Original Score	Trent Reznor and Atticus Ross; Challengers			Daniel Blumberg; The Brutalist	—N/a	Daniel Blumberg; The Brutalist
Best Original Song	"El Mal"; Emilia Pérez			—N/a	—N/a	"El Mal"; Emilia Pérez
Best Foreign Language Film	Emilia Pérez				—N/a	I'm Still Here
Best Documentary (Note: From 2016 onward, the category was shifted from the Critics' Choice Awards to the ancillary Critics' Choice Documentary Awards.)	—N/a		Super/Man: The Christopher Reeve Story; Will & Harper (tie)	Super/Man: The Christopher Reeve Story		No Other Land

Palme d'Or (77th Cannes Film Festival):

Anora, directed by Sean Baker, United States

Golden Lion (81st Venice International Film Festival):

The Room Next Door, directed by Pedro Almodóvar, Spain

Golden Bear (74th Berlin International Film Festival):

Dahomey, directed by Mati Diop, France

People's Choice Award (49th Toronto International Film Festival):

The Life of Chuck, directed by Mike Flanagan, United States

== 2024 films ==
=== By country/region ===
- List of American films of 2024
- List of Argentine films of 2024
- List of Australian films of 2024
- List of Bangladeshi films of 2024
- List of Brazilian films of 2024
- List of British films of 2024
- List of Canadian films of 2024
- List of Chinese films of 2024
- List of French films of 2024
- List of German films of 2024
- List of Hong Kong films of 2024
- List of Indian films of 2024
- List of Japanese films of 2024
- List of Malaysian films of 2024
- List of Pakistani films of 2024
- List of Philippine films of 2024
- List of Russian films of 2024
- List of South Korean films of 2024
- List of Spanish films of 2024
- List of Turkish films of 2024

=== By genre/medium ===
- List of animated feature films of 2024
- List of comedy films of 2024
- List of drama films of 2024
- List of horror films of 2024
- List of LGBT-related films of 2024
- List of science fiction films of 2024
- List of thriller films of 2024

== Deaths ==
Month	Date	Name	Age	Country	Profession	Notable films	Ref.
January	1	Mickey Cottrell	79	US	Producer, Publicist, Actor	My Own Private Idaho; Volcano	
January	1	René Verzier	89	Canada	Cinematographer	The Little Girl Who Lives Down the Lane; Rabid	
January	2	Peter Berkos	101	US	Sound Editor	The Hindenburg; Slap Shot	
January	3	Lillian Crombie	66	Australia	Actress	Australia; Mystery Road	
January	3	Germana Dominici	77	Italy	Actress	Black Sunday; Intervista	
January	4	Georgina Hale	80	UK	Actress	The Devils; Mahler	
January	4	Glynis Johns	100	UK	Actress, Singer	The Sundowners; Mary Poppins	
January	4	Christian Oliver	51	Germany	Actor	The Good German; Speed Racer	
January	4	David Soul	80	US	Actor, Singer	Magnum Force; Appointment with Death	
January	4	Tracy Tormé	64	US	Screenwriter, Producer	Fire in the Sky; I Am Legend	
January	5	Brian McConnachie	81	US	Actor	Caddyshack; Sleepless in Seattle	
January	7	Menachem Daum	77	US	Director, Producer	A Life Apart; Hiding and Seeking	
January	8	Adan Canto	42	Mexico	Actor	X-Men: Days of Future Past; Bruised	
January	8	Ventura Pons	78	Spain	Director, Producer	Actrius; Caresses	
January	8	Gian Franco Reverberi	89	Italy	Composer	Django, Prepare a Coffin; Black Turin	
January	10	Roy Battersby	87	UK	Director	The Body; Mr. Love	
January	10	Peter Crombie	71	US	Actor	Seven; My Dog Skip	
January	10	Tisa Farrow	72	US	Actress	Zombi 2; Manhattan	
January	10	Conrad Palmisano	75	US	Stuntman, Second Unit Director, Actor	First Blood; Rush Hour	
January	11	Laurence Badie	95	France	Actress	Forbidden Games; The Soft Skin	
January	11	April Ferry	91	US	Costume Designer	Maverick; Donnie Darko	
January	11	Lynne Marta	78	US	Actress, Singer	Joe Kidd; Footloose	
January	11	Yury Solomin	88	Russia	Actor	Dersu Uzala; The Red Tent	
January	12	Bill Hayes	98	US	Actor, Singer	Stop, You're Killing Me; The Cardinal	
January	12	Marek Litewka	75	Poland	Actor	Camera Buff; The Constant Factor	
January	12	Alec Musser	50	US	Actor, Producer	Grown Ups; Best Summer Ever	
January	13	Juli Mira	75	Spain	Actor	The Sea; Voices in the Night	
January	14	Mo Henry	67	US	Film Negative Cutter	Apocalypse Now Redux; Interstellar	
January	14	Elisabeth Trissenaar	79	Austria	Actress	In a Year of 13 Moons; The Marriage of Maria Braun	
January	15	William O'Connell	94	US	Actor	High Plains Drifter; The Outlaw Josey Wales	
January	16	David Gail	58	US	Actor	Some Girl; Bending All the Rules	
January	16	Laurie Johnson	96	UK	Composer	Dr. Strangelove; First Men in the Moon	
January	16	José Lifante	80	Spain	Actor	Let Sleeping Corpses Lie; National Heritage	
January	16	Lahcen Zinoun	79	Morocco	Choreographer, Director	The Last Temptation of Christ; The Sheltering Sky	
January	17	Benedict Fitzgerald	74	US	Screenwriter	Wise Blood; The Passion of the Christ	
January	19	Héctor Bidonde	86	Argentina	Actor	Funny Dirty Little War; Night of the Pencils	
January	19	Lee Doo-yong	81	South Korea	Director, Screenwriter, Producer	Bruce Lee Fights Back from the Grave; Police Story	
January	20	David Emge	77	US	Actor	Dawn of the Dead; Basket Case 2	
January	20	Norman Jewison	97	Canada	Director, Producer	In the Heat of the Night; Moonstruck	
January	22	Gary Graham	73	US	Actor	The Hollywood Knights; All the Right Moves	
January	23	Margaret Riley	58	US	Producer	Love & Other Drugs; Bombshell	
January	27	Enrique Liporace	82	Argentina	Actor	Bolivia; Un oso rojo	
January	27	Sreela Majumdar	65	India	Actress	Mandi; Shankar Mudi	
January	29	Sandra Milo	90	Italy	Actress	8½; Juliet of the Spirits	
January	30	Hinton Battle	67	US	Actor, Singer	Foreign Student; Dreamgirls	
January	30	Chita Rivera	91	US	Actress, Singer	Sweet Charity; Kalamazoo?	
January	30	Michael Trcic	63	US	Special Effects Artist, Puppeteer	Terminator 2: Judgment Day; Jurassic Park	
February	1	Mark Gustafson	63	US	Animator, Director	Fantastic Mr. Fox; Guillermo del Toro's Pinocchio	
February	1	Carl Weathers	76	US	Actor	Rocky; Predator	
February	2	Ian Lavender	77	UK	Actor	Dad's Army; Carry On Behind	
February	2	Sadhu Meher	84	India	Actor	Ankur; Mrigayaa	
February	2	Don Murray	94	US	Actor	Bus Stop; Peggy Sue Got Married	
February	2	Gregory Charles Rivers	58	Hong Kong	Actor	Little Big Master; My People, My Country	
February	3	Helena Rojo	79	Mexico	Actress	Aguirre, the Wrath of God; Blacker Than the Night	
February	5	Mickey Gilbert	87	US	Stuntman, Second Unit Director, Actor	The Blues Brothers; The Last of the Mohicans	
February	5	Michael Jayston	88	UK	Actor	Cromwell; Nicholas and Alexandra	
February	5	Toby Keith	62	US	Actor, Screenwriter, Singer	Broken Bridges; Beer for My Horses	
February	5	Namkoong Won	89	South Korea	Actor	Woman of Fire; Inchon	
February	6	Robert M. Young	99	US	Director, Cinematographer, Producer	Alambrista!; The Ballad of Gregorio Cortez	
February	7	Mojo Nixon	66	US	Actor	Great Balls of Fire!; Super Mario Bros.	
February	9	Frank Howson	72	Australia	Director, Producer, Screenwriter	Boulevard of Broken Dreams; Flynn	
February	10	Johanna von Koczian	90	Germany	Actress	Wir Wunderkinder; For the First Time	
February	12	Sam Mercer	69	US	Producer, Location Manager	The Sixth Sense; Unbreakable	
February	12	Alec Mills	91	UK	Cinematographer, Camera Operator	The Living Daylights; Licence to Kill	
February	13	Aletta Bezuidenhout	74	South Africa	Actress	Paljas; In My Country	
February	13	Alain Dorval	77	France	Actor	Mutafukaz; The Jungle Bunch	
February	15	Gérard Barray	92	France	Actor	Captain Fracasse; Open Your Eyes	
February	15	Anne Whitfield	85	US	Actress	White Christmas; Juvenile Jungle	
February	16	Ileen Maisel	68	US	Producer	Ripley's Game; The Golden Compass	
February	17	Anjana Bhowmick	79	India	Actress	Thana Theke Aschi; Nayika Sangbad	
February	18	Roger Dicken	84	UK	Special Effects Artist	When Dinosaurs Ruled the Earth; Alien	
February	18	Lanny Flaherty	81	US	Actor	Miller's Crossing; Signs	
February	18	Ira von Fürstenberg	83	Italy	Actress	Hello-Goodbye; Five Dolls for an August Moon	
February	18	Tony Ganios	64	US	Actor	The Wanderers; Porky's	
February	19	Roland Bertin	93	France	Actor	Diva; Cyrano de Bergerac	
February	19	Paul D'Amato	75	US	Actor	Slap Shot; The Deer Hunter	
February	19	Ewen MacIntosh	50	UK	Actor, Comedian	The Lobster; The Bromley Boys	
February	19	Matt Sweeney	75	US	Special Effects Artist	The Goonies; Apollo 13	
February	20	Yoko Yamamoto	81	Japan	Actress	Red Handkerchief; Gappa: The Triphibian Monster	
February	21	Micheline Presle	101	France	Actress	Under My Skin; Adventures of Captain Fabian	
February	21	Pamela Salem	80	UK	Actress	Never Say Never Again; Gods and Monsters	
February	21	John Savident	86	UK	Actor	A Clockwork Orange; Mountains of the Moon	
February	22	Kent Melton	68	US	Animation Sculptor	Aladdin; The Lion King	
February	23	Chris Gauthier	48	Canada	Actor	Freddy vs. Jason; Watchmen	
February	23	Lynda Gravátt	76	US	Actress	Delivery Man; Roman J. Israel, Esq.	
February	23	Jackie Loughery	93	US	Actress	Pardners; The D.I.	
February	24	Kenneth Mitchell	49	Canada	Actor	Miracle; Captain Marvel	
February	24	Kumar Shahani	83	India	Director, Screenwriter	Maya Darpan; Tarang	
February	25	Charles Dierkop	87	US	Actor	Butch Cassidy and the Sundance Kid; The Sting	
February	27	Michael Culver	85	UK	Actor	The Empire Strikes Back; A Passage to India	
February	27	Richard Lewis	76	US	Actor	Robin Hood: Men in Tights; Leaving Las Vegas	
February	28	Jean Allison	94	US	Actress	Bad Company; Hardcore	
February	28	Werner Nold	90	Canada	Film Editor	The Merry World of Leopold Z; IXE-13	
February	29	Paolo Taviani	92	Italy	Director, Screenwriter	Caesar Must Die; Padre Padrone	
March	1	Akira Toriyama	68	Japan	Character Designer, Screenwriter	Dragon Ball Z: Battle of Gods; Dragon Ball Z: Resurrection 'F'	
March	2	Mark Dodson	64	US	Voice Actor	Return of the Jedi; Gremlins	
March	2	Paul Houde	69	Canada	Actor	Les Boys; Winter Stories	
March	2	Jaclyn Jose	60	Philippines	Actress	Ma' Rosa; Fantastica	
March	3	Edward Bond	89	UK	Screenwriter	Blowup; Walkabout	
March	3	Betty Brodel	104	US	Actress	Swing Hostess; Too Young to Know	
March	4	Tarako	63	Japan	Actress, Singer	Nausicaä of the Valley of the Wind; Castle in the Sky	
March	4	Jean-Pierre Bourtayre	82	France	Composer	The Game Is Over; Les Maîtres du temps	
March	4	Michael Jenkins	77	Australia	Director, Screenwriter	Sweet Talker; The Heartbreak Kid	
March	4	Juan Verduzco	78	Mexico	Actor	¡Qué familia tan cotorra!; Toña, nacida virgen (Del oficio)	
March	5	Roberto Leoni	83	Italy	Screenwriter, Director	My Dear Killer; Santa Sangre	
March	5	Misha Suslov	84	Russia	Cinematographer	Black Moon Rising; Prancer	
March	7	Steve Lawrence	88	US	Actor, Comedian, Singer	The Blues Brothers; The Yards	
March	10	Percy Adlon	88	Germany	Director, Screenwriter, Producer	Bagdad Cafe; Rosalie Goes Shopping	
March	10	Gigio Morra	78	Italy	Actor	Gomorrah; Pinocchio	
March	11	Malachy McCourt	92	US	Actor	The Devil's Own; After.Life	
March	11	Surya Kiran	49	India	Actor, Director	Satyam; Brahmastram	
March	12 (Note: The day she was found dead. It is unknown if she died on that day.)	Robyn Bernard	64	US	Actress	Betty Blue; Roselyne and the Lions	
March	12	Maria Richwine	71	US	Actress	The Buddy Holly Story; Hamburger: The Motion Picture	
March	13	Julius Kohanyi	91	Canada	Director, Screenwriter, Producer	Summer's Children; The War Boy	
March	14	David Breashears	68	US	Director, Producer, Camera Operator	Seven Years in Tibet; Everest	
March	14	Grant Page	85	Australia	Stuntman, Actor	Mad Max; Roadgames	
March	14	Minori Terada	81	Japan	Actor	Castle in the Sky; The Human Bullet	
March	15	Joe Camp	84	US	Director, Screenwriter, Producer	Benji; Hawmps!	
March	15	Aleksandr Shirvindt	89	Russia	Actor	Grandads-Robbers; Station for Two	
March	16	David Seidler	86	UK	Screenwriter	Tucker: The Man and His Dream; The King's Speech	
March	18	Jennifer Leak	76	Canada	Actress	Yours, Mine and Ours; The Incubus	
March	19	Dianne Crittenden	82	US	Casting Director	Star Wars; Spider-Man 2	
March	19	M. Emmet Walsh	88	US	Actor	Blade Runner; Blood Simple	
March	20	Winai Kraibutr	54	Thailand	Actor	Nang Nak; Bang Rajan	
March	21	Ron Harper	91	US	Actor	Pearl Harbor; The Poughkeepsie Tapes	
March	22	Partha Sarathi Deb	68	India	Actor	Lathi; Prem Aamar	
March	23	Daniel Beretta	77	France	Actor	Revolver; Faceless	
March	23	Eli Noyes	81	US	Director, Animator	Under Our Skin; The Most Dangerous Man in America	
March	23	Abdulah Sidran	79	Bosnia	Screenwriter	Do You Remember Dolly Bell?; When Father Was Away on Business	
March	23	Silvia Tortosa	77	Spain	Actress	Horror Express; Unfinished Business	
March	25	Paula Weinstein	78	US	Producer	The Fabulous Baker Boys; The Perfect Storm	
March	25	Fritz Wepper	82	Germany	Actor	Die Brücke; Cabaret	
March	29	Louis Gossett Jr.	87	US	Actor	An Officer and a Gentleman; Enemy Mine	
March	29	Chance Perdomo	27	UK	Actor	After We Fell; After Ever Happy	
March	30	Tim McGovern	68	US	Visual Effects Artist	Total Recall; Last Action Hero	
March	31	Barbara Baldavin	85	US	Actress, Casting Director	Skeeter; Fallen Arches	
March	31	Rob Kaman	63	Netherlands	Actor	Bloodfist; Legionnaire	
March	31	Barbara Rush	97	US	Actress	It Came from Outer Space; Hombre	
April	1	Joe Flaherty	82	US	Actor, Comedian	Back to the Future Part II; Happy Gilmore	
April	2	Christopher Durang	75	US	Actor	The Secret of My Success; Housesitter	
April	2	Tatyana Konyukhova	92	Russia	Actress	The Boys from Leningrad; The Red and the White	
April	3	Adrian Schiller	60	UK	Actor	The Danish Girl; Suffragette	
April	3	Vera Tschechowa	83	Germany	Actress, Producer	The Curse of the Hidden Vault; Euridice BA 2037	
April	4	Bruce Kessler	88	US	Director	The Gay Deceivers; Simon, King of the Witches	
April	5	R. F. Lucchetti	94	Brazil	Screenwriter	The Strange World of Coffin Joe; Hallucinations of a Deranged Mind	
April	5	Peter Sodann	87	Germany	Actor	Die Männer der Emden; Gundermann	
April	6	Ernesto Gómez Cruz	90	Mexico	Actor	The Mexican; The Crime of Padre Amaro	
April	7	Edgar Burcksen	76	Netherlands	Film Editor	Left Luggage; Darfur Now	
April	9	Jaime de Armiñán	97	Spain	Director, Screenwriter	My Dearest Senorita; The Nest	
April	9	Patti Astor	74	US	Actress	Underground U.S.A.; Wild Style	
April	9	Carla Balenda	98	US	Actress	Hunt the Man Down; Sealed Cargo	
April	9	Eckart Dux	97	Germany	Actor	The House in Montevideo; The Singing Ringing Tree	
April	10	O. J. Simpson	76	US	Actor	The Naked Gun; The Towering Inferno	
April	10	Dan Wallin	97	US	Sound Engineer	Woodstock; A Star Is Born	
April	12	Eleanor Coppola	87	US	Director, Screenwriter	Hearts of Darkness: A Filmmaker's Apocalypse; Paris Can Wait	
April	13	Richard Horowitz	75	US	Composer	Any Given Sunday; Three Seasons	
April	13	Rochelle Oliver	86	US	Actress	Next Stop, Greenwich Village; Scent of a Woman	
April	13	Ron Thompson	83	US	Actor, Singer	American Pop; Deep Cover	
April	14	Vincent Friell	64	UK	Actor	Trainspotting; The Angels' Share	
April	14	Jacques Lussier	64	Canada	Actor	Louis 19, King of the Airwaves; Grey Owl	
April	16	Barbara O. Jones	82	US	Actress	Demon Seed; Daughters of the Dust	
April	18	James Laurenson	84	New Zealand	Actor	Pink Floyd – The Wall; The Cat's Meow	
April	18	Spencer Milligan	86	US	Actor	Sleeper; The Photographer	
April	20	Antonio Cantafora	80	Italy	Actor	Demons 2; Intervista	
April	20	Roman Gabriel	83	US	Actor	Skidoo; The Undefeated	
April	20	Lourdes Portillo	80	Mexico	Director, Producer	The Mothers of Plaza de Mayo; The Devil Never Sleeps	
April	22	Hana Brejchová	77	Czech Republic	Actress	Loves of a Blonde; Angel in a Devil's Body	
April	22	Philippe Laudenbach	88	France	Actor	Betty Blue; Of Gods and Men	
April	22	Michael Verhoeven	85	Germany	Director, Screenwriter	The Nasty Girl; Die Weiße Rose	
April	23	Terry Carter	95	US	Actor	Benji; Foxy Brown	
April	23	Ray Chan	56	UK	Art Director, Production Designer	Children of Men; Deadpool & Wolverine	
April	24	Margaret Lee	80	UK	Actress	Venus in Furs; The Bloody Judge	
April	25	Marla Adams	85	US	Actress	Splendor in the Grass; Gotcha!	
April	25	Ferenc András	81	Hungary	Director, Screenwriter	The Vulture; Rain and Shine	
April	25	Laurent Cantet	63	France	Director, Screenwriter	Time Out; The Class	
April	27	Roy Boyd	85	UK	Actor	The Wicker Man; The Omen	
April	28	Brian McCardie	59	UK	Actor	The Ghost and the Darkness; Filth	
April	28	Zack Norman	83	US	Actor, Comedian, Producer	Romancing the Stone; Cadillac Man	
April	28	Alan Scarfe	77	UK	Actor	Double Impact; Lethal Weapon 3	
April	30	Paul Auster	77	US	Director, Screenwriter	Smoke; Lulu on the Bridge	
May	2	Roxanne	95	US	Actress	The Seven Year Itch; The Young Don't Cry	
May	2	Susan Buckner	72	US	Actress	Grease; Deadly Blessing	
May	2	Edgar Lansbury	94	UK	Producer	Godspell; Blue Sunshine	
May	4	Anna Panagiotopoulou	76	Greece	Actress	Safe Sex; Crying... Silicon Tears	
May	5	Jeannie Epper	83	US	Actress, Stuntwoman	Romancing the Stone; Catch Me If You Can	
May	5	Bernard Hill	79	UK	Actor	Titanic; The Lord of the Rings	
May	5	Gloria Stroock	99	US	Actress	The Day of the Locust; Fun with Dick and Jane	
May	6	Ian Gelder	74	UK	Actor	King Ralph; Pope Joan	
May	6	Harikumar	68	India	Director	Puli Varunne Puli; Jaalakam	
May	6	Kanakalatha	63	India	Actress	Pookkaalam; Aakasha Ganga 2	
May	6	Robert Logan Jr.	82	US	Actor	The Bridge at Remagen; The Adventures of the Wilderness Family	
May	6	Brian Wenzel	94	Australia	Actor, Comedian, Singer	The Odd Angry Shot; John Doe: Vigilante	
May	7	Evald Aavik	83	Estonia	Actor	Nest of Winds; Georgica	
May	7	John Charles	83	New Zealand	Composer	Goodbye Pork Pie; The Quiet Earth	
May	8	Sangeeth Sivan	65	India	Director, Screenwriter	Gandharvam; Apna Sapna Money Money	
May	9	Roger Corman	98	US	Director, Producer, Actor	The Little Shop of Horrors; The Pit and the Pendulum	
May	10	Sam Rubin	64	US	Actor	Fantastic Four; America's Sweethearts	
May	10	Hans Wahlgren	86	Sweden	Actor	Raggare!; To Be a Millionaire	
May	11	Susan Backlinie	77	US	Actress	Jaws; Day of the Animals	
May	11	Kevin Brophy	70	US	Actor	The Long Riders; Hell Night	
May	12	Paulo César Pereio	83	Brazil	Actor	Entranced Earth; Drained	
May	12	Mark Damon	91	US	Actor, Producer	House of Usher; Monster	
May	13	Samm-Art Williams	78	US	Actor, Screenwriter	The Wanderers; Dressed to Kill	
May	14	Baiba Indriksone	92	Latvia	Actress	A Limousine the Colour of Midsummer's Eve; The Devil's Servants	
May	14	Gudrun Ure	98	UK	Actress	36 Hours; Doctor in the House	
May	15	Barbra Fuller	102	US	Actress	Rock Island Trail; The Roommates	
May	15	Elda Peralta	91	Mexico	Actress	Hypocrite; A Woman Without Love	
May	16	Dabney Coleman	92	US	Actor	9 to 5; WarGames	
May	16	Zari Khoshkam	76	Iran	Actress	Topoli; What's the Time in Your World?	
May	17	Stephen J. Rivele	75	US	Screenwriter, Producer	Nixon; Ali	
May	17	Hideyuki Umezu	68	Japan	Actor	Fullmetal Alchemist: The Sacred Star of Milos; Patema Inverted	
May	18	Fred Roos	89	US	Producer, Casting Director	The Godfather Part II; Apocalypse Now	
May	19	Richard Foronjy	86	US	Actor	Midnight Run; Carlito's Way	
May	21	Jan A. P. Kaczmarek	71	Poland	Composer	Finding Neverland; The Visitor	
May	22	Darryl Hickman	92	US	Actor	The Grapes of Wrath; Network	
May	23	Morgan Spurlock	53	US	Documentarian	Super Size Me; The Greatest Movie Ever Sold	
May	24	Jan Kačer	87	Czech Republic	Actor	The Valley of the Bees; Wolf's Hole	
May	25	Johnny Ngan	71	Hong Kong	Actor	Mad, Mad 83; Project A Part II	
May	25	Albert S. Ruddy	94	Canada	Producer	The Godfather; Million Dollar Baby	
May	25	Richard M. Sherman	95	US	Composer, Songwriter	Mary Poppins; The Jungle Book	
May	25	Johnny Wactor	37	US	Actor	USS Indianapolis: Men of Courage; Supercell	
May	27	Elizabeth MacRae	88	US	Actress	The Incredible Mr. Limpet; The Conversation	
May	29	Margot Benacerraf	97	Venezuela	Director	Reverón; Araya	
May	29	Anastasia Zavorotnyuk	53	Russia	Actress	The Apocalypse Code; Office Romance. Our Time	
May	30	Mitchell Block	73	US	Director, Producer	No Lies; Big Mama	
May	30	Tom Bower	86	US	Actor	Die Hard 2; El Camino	
May	30	Dorothy Bromiley	93	UK	Actress	The Girls of Pleasure Island; The Criminal	
May	31	Martin Starger	92	US	Producer	Nashville; Sophie's Choice	
May	31	Kátya Tompos	41	Hungary	Actress	Coming Out; Question in Details	
June	1	Erich Anderson	67	US	Actor	Friday the 13th: The Final Chapter; Unfaithful	
June	1	Ruth Maria Kubitschek	92	Germany	Actress	The Silent Star; He Can't Stop Doing It	
June	1	Philippe Leroy	93	France	Actor	A Married Woman; The Hole	
June	2	Jeannette Charles	96	UK	Actress	National Lampoon's European Vacation; The Naked Gun	
June	2	Janis Paige	101	US	Actress, Singer	Cheyenne; Please Don't Eat the Daisies	
June	2	Armando Silvestre	98	US	Actor	The Scalphunters; Two Mules for Sister Sara	
June	3	William Russell	99	UK	Actor	The Man Who Never Was; The Great Escape	
June	4	Nicholas Ball	78	UK	Actor	Lifeforce; Croupier	
June	4	Hubert Taczanowski	63	UK	Cinematographer	The Opposite of Sex; Spooks: The Greater Good	
June	5	Rosalina Neri	96	Italy	Actress	Three Men and a Leg; All the Moron's Men	
June	8	Ramoji Rao	87	India	Producer	Chitram; Nuvve Kavali	
June	9	Marzena Kipiel-Sztuka	58	Poland	Actress	Character; Tricks	
June	9	Yoshiko Kuga	93	Japan	Actress	Drunken Angel; Good Morning	
June	11	Françoise Hardy	80	France	Singer, Actress	Grand Prix; Nutty, Naughty Chateau	
June	11	Tony Lo Bianco	87	US	Actor	The Honeymoon Killers; The French Connection	
June	11	Tony Mordente	88	US	Actor, Choreographer, Dancer	West Side Story; The Daydreamer	
June	12	Ron Simons	63	US	Actor, Producer	27 Dresses; Blue Caprice	
June	13	Benji Gregory	46	US	Actor	Jumpin' Jack Flash; Once Upon a Forest	
June	15	Érik Canuel	63	Canada	Director	The Last Tunnel; Bon Cop, Bad Cop	
June	16	Evans Evans	91	US	Actress	Bonnie and Clyde; The Iceman Cometh	
June	18	Anouk Aimée	92	France	Actress	A Man and a Woman; La dolce vita	
June	18	Anthea Sylbert	84	US	Costume Designer, Producer	Chinatown; Julia	
June	20	Donald Sutherland	88	Canada	Actor	M*A*S*H; The Hunger Games	
June	23	Tamayo Perry	49	US	Actor	Blue Crush; Pirates of the Caribbean: On Stranger Tides	
June	23	Bud S. Smith	88	US	Film Editor, Producer	The Exorcist; Flashdance	
June	24	Shifty Shellshock	49	US	Singer, Actor	Clifford; Willowbee	
June	24	Joan Benedict Steiger	96	US	Actress	The Happy Hooker Goes to Washington; The Prize Fighter	
June	25	Bill Cobbs	90	US	Actor	The Color of Money; Night at the Museum	
June	26	Pat Heywood	92	UK	Actress	Romeo and Juliet; 10 Rillington Place	
June	26	Taiki Matsuno	56	Japan	Actor	The Hidden Blade; Tokyo Family	
June	27	Martin Mull	80	US	Actor	Clue; Mrs. Doubtfire	
June	28	Txema Blasco	82	Spain	Actor	The Red Squirrel; Earth	
June	30	Maria Rosaria Omaggio	67	Italy	Actress	The Cop in Blue Jeans; The Tough Ones	
July	1	Robert Towne	89	US	Screenwriter, Director	The Last Detail; Chinatown	
July	5	Yvonne Furneaux	98	France	Actress	La Dolce Vita; Repulsion	
July	5	Jon Landau	63	US	Producer	Titanic; Avatar	
July	6	Angela Pagano	87	Italy	Actress	Red Moon; The Hideout	
July	7	Bruno Zanin	73	Italy	Actor	Amarcord; The Moro Affair	
July	9	David Loughery	71	US	Screenwriter, Producer	Passenger 57; Lakeview Terrace	
July	9	Jerzy Stuhr	77	Poland	Actor	O-Bi, O-Ba: The End of Civilization; We Have a Pope	
July	11	Aparna	57	India	Actress	Masanada Hoovu; Inspector Vikram	
July	11	Shelley Duvall	75	US	Actress	Annie Hall; Popeye	
July	13	Shannen Doherty	53	US	Actress	Girls Just Want to Have Fun; Heathers	
July	13	James B. Sikking	90	US	Actor	Ordinary People; Star Trek III: The Search for Spock	
July	14	M. Mani	77	India	Producer	Dheerasameere Yamuna Theere; Rowdy Ramu	
July	15	Jacques Boudet	89	France	Actor	La Femme Nikita; Those Happy Days	
July	15	Whitney Rydbeck	79	US	Actor	1941; Friday the 13th Part VI: Jason Lives	
July	17	Cheng Pei-pei	78	China	Actress	Come Drink with Me; Crouching Tiger, Hidden Dragon	
July	18	Bob Newhart	94	US	Actor	Catch-22; Elf	
July	19	Aldo Puglisi	89	Italy	Actor	Seduced and Abandoned; Marriage Italian Style	
July	21	Salvatore Piscicelli	76	Italy	Director, Screenwriter	At the End of the Night; The Opportunities of Rosa	
July	23	Teresa Gimpera	87	Spain	Actress	The Spirit of the Beehive; Tuset Street	
July	26	Janet Andrewartha	72	Australia	Actress	Ground Zero; Amy	
July	27	Edna O'Brien	93	Ireland	Screenwriter	Girl with Green Eyes; I Was Happy Here	
July	28	Erica Ash	46	US	Actress, Comedian, Singer	Uncle Drew; We Have a Ghost	
July	28	Chino XL	50	US	Actor	Alex & Emma; The Beat	
July	29	Robert Banas	90	US	Actor, Choreographer	West Side Story; Always	
July	30	Onyeka Onwenu	72	Nigeria	Actress, Singer	Half of a Yellow Sun; Lionheart	
July	30	Lisa Westcott	76	UK	Makeup Artist	Shakespeare in Love; Les Misérables	
July	31	Roberto Herlitzka	87	Italy	Actor	Good Morning, Night; The Great Beauty	
July	31	Genco Erkal	86	Turkey	Actor	A Season in Hakkari; The Market: A Tale of Trade	
August	1	Pina Bottin	91	Italy	Actress	A Hero of Our Times; Hannibal	
August	1	Rainer Brandt	88	Germany	Actor	Funeral in Berlin; The Hound of Blackwood Castle	
August	1	Leonard Engelman	83	US	Makeup Artist	Ghostbusters; Beverly Hills Cop	
August	3	George Schenck	82	US	Screenwriter	Barquero; Futureworld	
August	4	Charles Cyphers	85	US	Actor	Halloween; Escape from New York	
August	4	Lily Monteverde	84	Philippines	Producer	Mano Po; Mano Po 2: My Home	
August	5	John Aprea	83	US	Actor	The Godfather Part II; The Stepford Wives	
August	5	Patti Yasutake	70	US	Actress	Gung Ho; Star Trek Generations	
August	6	Connie Chiume	72	South Africa	Actress	Black Panther; Black Is King	
August	6	Jay Kanter	97	US	Producer	Villain; Fear Is the Key	
August	7	Margaret Ménégoz	83	Hungary	Producer	Caché; Amour	
August	8	Mitzi McCall	91	US	Actress, Comedian	You're Never Too Young; World's Greatest Dad	
August	10	Rachael Lillis	55	US	Voice Actress	Pokémon: The First Movie; Adolescence of Utena	
August	10	Peggy Moffitt	86	US	Actress	Battle Flame; Girls Town	
August	11	Ángel Salazar	68	Cuba	Actor, Comedian	Scarface; Punchline	
August	12	Kim Kahana	94	US	Stuntman, Actor	Cool Hand Luke; Planet of the Apes	
August	13	Sergio Donati	91	Italy	Screenwriter	Once Upon a Time in the West; Duck, You Sucker!	
August	14	Denise Gagnon	87	Canada	Actress	Octobre; The Novena	
August	14	Gena Rowlands	94	US	Actress	A Woman Under the Influence; The Notebook	
August	15	Peter Marshall	98	US	Actor	Ensign Pulver; Annie	
August	15	Ľubomír Paulovič	71	Slovakia	Actor	The Salt Prince; The Peacemaker	
August	16	Robert Sidaway	82	UK	Actor, Producer	Battle of the Brave; Modigliani	
August	16	Norman Spencer	110	UK	Producer, Production Manager	Summertime; Vanishing Point	
August	18	Boris Bystrov	79	Russia	Actor, Voice Actor	Aladdin and His Magic Lamp; Adventures of the Yellow Suitcase	
August	18	Alain Delon	88	France	Actor, Producer	The Leopard; Le Samouraï	
August	18	Vladislav Gostishchev	83	Russia	Actor	At the Beginning of Glorious Days; A Cruel Romance	
August	20	Atsuko Tanaka	61	Japan	Voice Actress	Ghost in the Shell; Ghost in the Shell 2: Innocence	
August	21	John Amos	84	US	Actor	The Beastmaster; Coming to America	
August	23	Catherine Ribeiro	82	France	Actress	The Carabineers; Buffalo Bill, Hero of the Far West	
August	24	Karel Heřmánek	76	Czech Republic	Actor	Forbidden Dreams; Thanks for Every New Morning	
August	27	Ron Hale	78	US	Actor	All the President's Men; Trial by Jury	
August	27	Jim Houghton	75	US	Actor	More American Graffiti; Superstition	
August	28	K. C. Fox	70	US	Set Decorator	Speed; The Girl with the Dragon Tattoo	
August	30	Jean-Charles Tacchella	98	France	Director, Screenwriter	Cousin Cousine; Seven Sundays	
September	1	Norman Chui	73	Hong Kong	Actor	Vengeful Beauty; King of Beggars	
September	1	Eric Gilliland	62	US	Actor	Hair High; The Ultimate Gift	
September	1	Ahu Tuğba	69	Turkey	Actress	Banker Bilo; Ayrılık	
September	2	James Darren	88	US	Actor, Singer	Gidget; The Guns of Navarone	
September	5	Laurent Tirard	57	France	Director, Screenwriter	Little Nicholas; Asterix and Obelix: God Save Britannia	
September	6	Will Jennings	80	US	Lyricist	Titanic; An Officer and a Gentleman	
September	8	Henny Moan	88	Norway	Actress	Nine Lives; Lake of the Dead	
September	8	Peter Renaday	89	US	Actor, Voice Actor	The Computer Wore Tennis Shoes; The Black Cauldron	
September	8	Emi Shinohara	61	Japan	Voice Actress	Ninja Scroll; Perfect Blue	
September	9	James Earl Jones	93	US	Actor	Star Wars; Field of Dreams	
September	10	Maria Politseymako	86	Russia	Actress	100 Days Before the Command; House of Fools	
September	11	Kenneth Cope	93	UK	Actor	Dunkirk; The Damned	
September	11	Chad McQueen	63	US	Actor	The Karate Kid; Martial Law	
September	13	Franca Bettoia	88	Italy	Actress	The Last Man on Earth; A Man of Straw	
September	13	Lex Marinos	75	Australia	Actor	Goodbye Paradise; Bedevil	
September	14	Jean-Michel Dupuis	69	France	Actor	Little Marcel; Dossier 51	
September	16	Barbara Leigh-Hunt	88	UK	Actress	Frenzy; Billy Elliot	
September	17	C. I. D. Sakunthala	84	India	Actress	Thavapudhalavan; Punnagai Mannan	
September	20	Kathryn Crosby	90	US	Actress, Singer	The 7th Voyage of Sinbad; Anatomy of a Murder	
September	20	David Graham	99	UK	Actor	The Pleasure Girls; Thunderbirds Are Go	
September	20	Cleo Sylvestre	79	UK	Actress	Sammy and Rosie Get Laid; Paddington	
September	23	Tomris Giritlioğlu	67	Turkey	Director	Mrs. Salkım's Diamonds; Pains of Autumn	
September	24	Pierre-William Glenn	80	France	Cinematographer, Director	Day for Night; Street of No Return	
September	25	Roman Madyanov	62	Russia	Actor	12; Leviathan	
September	26	John Ashton	76	US	Actor	Beverly Hills Cop; Midnight Run	
September	27	Maggie Smith	89	UK	Actress	The Prime of Miss Jean Brodie; Harry Potter	
September	28	Kris Kristofferson	88	US	Actor, Singer	A Star Is Born; Blade	
September	28	Glauco Mauri	93	Italy	Actor	Deep Red; China Is Near	
September	29	Ron Ely	86	US	Actor	The Night of the Grizzly; Doc Savage: The Man of Bronze	
September	30	Park Ji-ah	52	South Korea	Actress	The Coast Guard; 3-Iron	
September	30	Ken Page	70	US	Actor	The Nightmare Before Christmas; All Dogs Go to Heaven	
September	30	Robert Watts	86	UK	Producer	Indiana Jones; Who Framed Roger Rabbit	
October	1	Bob Yerkes	92	US	Stuntman	Return of the Jedi; Back to the Future	
October	2	Emily Richard	76	UK	Actress	Hansel and Gretel; Empire of the Sun	
October	3	Keerikkadan Jose	72	India	Actor	Kireedam; Mimics Parade	
October	4	Michel Blanc	72	France	Actor, Screenwriter, Director	Evening Dress; Monsieur Hire	
October	4	John Lasell	95	US	Actor	Suppose They Gave a War and Nobody Came; The Organization	
October	7	Cissy Houston	91	US	Singer, Actress	The Preacher's Wife; God's Not Dead: A Light in Darkness	
October	7	Nicholas Pryor	89	US	Actor	Airplane!; Risky Business	
October	8	Jorge Arriagada	81	France	Composer	Our Lady of the Assassins; The Women on the 6th Floor	
October	9	Elisa Montés	89	Spain	Actress	Seven Dollars on the Red; Texas, Adios	
October	9	Pierre Vernier	93	France	Actor	Under the Sand; The Chef	
October	11	Roger Browne	94	US	Actor	The Ten Gladiators; Three Swords for Rome	
October	11	Mario Morra	89	Italy	Film Editor	The Battle of Algiers; Cinema Paradiso	
October	12	Alvin Rakoff	97	Canada	Director	Hoffman; Death Ship	
October	16	Liam Payne	31	UK	Singer, Actor	Fifty Shades Freed; Ron's Gone Wrong	
October	16	Joe Viola	86	US	Director, Screenwriter	Angels Hard as They Come; The Hot Box	
October	17	Mitzi Gaynor	93	US	Actress	South Pacific; There's No Business Like Show Business	
October	17	Aaron Kaufman	51	US	Producer, Director	Machete Kills; Sin City: A Dame to Kill For	
October	17	Toshiyuki Nishida	76	Japan	Actor	Tsuribaka Nisshi; The Ramen Girl	
October	20	Adamo Dionisi	59	Italy	Actor	Suburra; Dogman	
October	21	Christine Boisson	68	France	Actress	Emmanuelle; Identification of a Woman	
October	22	Lynda Obst	74	US	Producer	Contact; Interstellar	
October	22	Dick Pope	77	UK	Cinematographer	The Illusionist; Mr. Turner	
October	24	John F. Burnett	90	US	Film Editor	Murder by Death; Grease	
October	25	David Harris	75	US	Actor	The Warriors; A Soldier's Story	
October	25	Kim Soo-mi	75	South Korea	Actress	Barefoot Ki-bong; Late Blossom	
October	26	Stephanie Collie	60	UK	Costume Designer	Lock, Stock and Two Smoking Barrels; Layer Cake	
October	27	Lily Li	74	Hong Kong	Actress	The Wandering Swordsman; Executioners from Shaolin	
October	28	Paul Morrissey	86	US	Director	Blood for Dracula; Flesh for Frankenstein	
October	29	Teri Garr	79	US	Actress	Young Frankenstein; Close Encounters of the Third Kind	
October	29	Suzanne Osten	80	Sweden	Director, Screenwriter	The Mozart Brothers; Speak Up! It's So Dark	
October	29	Ragne Veensalu	37	Estonia	Actress	Idioot; Kättemaksukontor	
October	30	Giovanni Cianfriglia	89	Italy	Actor, Stuntman	Superargo Versus Diabolicus; Kill Them All and Come Back Alone	
October	30	Erik Clausen	82	Denmark	Actor, Director	Temporary Release; Freedom on Parole	
November	2	Jonathan Haze	95	US	Actor	Stakeout on Dope Street; The Little Shop of Horrors	
November	2	Alan Rachins	82	US	Actor	Heart Condition; Showgirls	
November	3	Paul Engelen	75	UK	Makeup Artist	Star Wars: Episode I – The Phantom Menace; Gladiator	
November	3	Huckleberry Fox	50	US	Actor	Terms of Endearment; American Dreamer	
November	3	Quincy Jones	91	US	Composer, Producer	In the Heat of the Night; The Color Purple	
November	6	Fabio Sartor	70	Italy	Actor	The Luzhin Defence; The Passion of the Christ	
November	6	Tony Todd	69	US	Actor	Candyman; Final Destination	
November	8	Geneviève Grad	80	France	Actress	Gendarme of Saint-Tropez; Capitaine Fracasse	
November	9	Delhi Ganesh	80	India	Actor	Pattina Pravesam; Pasi	
November	11	Richard D. James	88	US	Art Director	Local Hero; Silkwood	
November	12	Manoj Mitra	86	India	Actor	Banchharamer Bagaan; Ghare Baire	
November	12	Song Jae-rim	39	South Korea	Actor	Grand Prix; Yaksha: Ruthless Operations	
November	12	Timothy West	90	UK	Actor	The Day of the Jackal; Cry Freedom	
November	13	Dan Hennessey	82	Canada	Actor, Voice Actor	Rock & Rule; The Care Bears Movie	
November	14	Shōhei Hino	75	Japan	Actor, Singer	Vengeance Is Mine; The Boy and the Heron	
November	15	Jon Kenny	66	Ireland	Actor, Comedian	Les Misérables; The Banshees of Inisherin	
November	15	Paul Teal	35	US	Actor	Fear Street Part Two: 1978; Deep Water	
November	16	Svetlana Svetlichnaya	84	Russia	Actress	The Diamond Arm; I Am Twenty	
November	17	Allan Svensson	73	Sweden	Actor	Strul; Detector	
November	18	Junko Hori	89	Japan	Actress	Night on the Galactic Railroad; Black Rain	
November	18	Colin Petersen	78	Australia	Actor	Smiley; A Cry from the Streets	
November	19	Colin Chilvers	79	UK	Special Effects Artist	The Rocky Horror Picture Show; X-Men	
November	20	Andy Paley	72	US	Composer	Shelf Life; Traveller	
November	21	Meghanathan	60	India	Actor	Action Hero Biju; Kooman	
November	22	Mark Withers	77	US	Actor	The Ultimate Life; The Phoenix Incident	
November	23	Michael Villella	84	US	Actor	The Slumber Party Massacre; Wild Orchid	
November	23	Chuck Woolery	83	US	Actor	The Treasure of Jamaica Reef; Six Pack	
November	24	Helen Gallagher	98	US	Actress	Strangers When We Meet; Roseland	
November	25	Earl Holliman	96	US	Actor, Singer	Forbidden Planet; Giant	
November	26	Jim Abrahams	80	US	Director, Screenwriter	Airplane!; Hot Shots!	
November	26	Katinka Faragó	87	Sweden	Producer, Production Manager	Fanny and Alexander; The Match Factory Girl	
November	26	Scott L. Schwartz	65	US	Actor	Ocean's; Starsky & Hutch	
November	27	Morgan Lofting	84	US	Actress	Joysticks; The Night Before	
November	27	Adam Somner	57	US	Assistant Director, Producer	The Wolf of Wall Street; Licorice Pizza	
November	28	Silvia Pinal	93	Mexico	Actress	Viridiana; The Exterminating Angel	
November	29	Marshall Brickman	85	US	Screenwriter, Director	Annie Hall; Manhattan	
November	29	Christian Juttner	60	US	Actor	Return from Witch Mountain; I Wanna Hold Your Hand	
December	1	Niels Arestrup	75	France	Actor	The Beat That My Heart Skipped; A Prophet	
December	2	Paul Maslansky	91	US	Producer, Screenwriter	Police Academy; Return to Oz	
December	4	Chiung Yao	86	Taiwan	Producer, Screenwriter	Four Loves; Outside the Window	
December	5	Thom Christopher	84	US	Actor	Space Raiders; Wizards of the Lost Kingdom	
December	6	Miho Nakayama	54	Japan	Actress, Singer	Love Letter; 108: Kaiba Gorō no Fukushū to Bōken	
December	6	Stanisław Tym	87	Poland	Actor, Comedian, Screenwriter	The Cruise; Teddy Bear	
December	8	Şerif Gören	80	Turkey	Director	Umut; Yol	
December	8	Jill Jacobson	70	US	Actress	Nurse Sherri; Splash	
December	9	Arnold Yarrow	104	UK	Actor, Screenwriter	Mahler; Son of the Pink Panther	
December	10	Michael Cole	84	US	Actor	Nickel Mountain; Mr. Brooks	
December	10	María Socas	65	Argentina	Actress	The Warrior and the Sorceress; Wizards of the Lost Kingdom	
December	11	Michio Mamiya	95	Japan	Composer	Gauche the Cellist; Grave of the Fireflies	
December	12	Wolfgang Becker	70	Germany	Director, Screenwriter	Life Is All You Get; Good Bye, Lenin!	
December	12	David Weatherley	85	New Zealand	Actor	The Lord of the Rings: The Fellowship of the Ring; Under the Mountain	
December	13	Diane Delano	67	US	Actress	The Ladykillers; The Wicker Man	
December	14	John R. Countryman	91	US	Actor	Jesse James; The Blue Bird	
December	14	Mircea Diaconu	74	Romania	Actor	Carnival Scenes; Philanthropy	
December	15	Zakir Hussain	73	India	Actor, Musician	Heat and Dust; Saaz	
December	15	Fada Santoro	100	Brazil	Actress	Needle in the Haystack; La Delatora	
December	16	Thomas Berly	92	India	Actor, Director, Producer	Thiramala; Ithu Manushyano	
December	17	Marisa Paredes	78	Spain	Actress	The Flower of My Secret; Life Is Beautiful	
December	19	Gwen Van Dam	96	US	Actress	Coming Home; Stir Crazy	
December	19	Meena Ganesh	81	India	Actress	Golanthara Vartha; Evidam Swargamanu	
December	19	Xie Fang	89	China	Actress	The Chinese Widow; Two Stage Sisters	
December	20	John Erwin	88	US	Actor, Voice Actor	Everybody's All-American; Back to the Future Part II	
December	21	Jack Bond	87	UK	Director, Screenwriter	Anti-Clock; It Couldn't Happen Here	
December	21	Michelle Botes	62	South Africa	Actress	American Ninja 2: The Confrontation; Arende	
December	21	Art Evans	82	US	Actor	Fright Night; Die Hard 2	
December	21	Hannelore Hoger	82	Germany	Actress	The Lost Honour of Katharina Blum; Heidi	
December	21	Hudson Meek	16	US	Actor	90 Minutes in Heaven; Baby Driver	
December	22	Geoffrey Deuel	81	US	Actor	Chisum; Terminal Island	
December	23	Shyam Benegal	90	India	Director, Screenwriter	Ankur; Nishant	
December	23	Angus MacInnes	77	Canada	Actor	Star Wars; Witness	
December	25	M. T. Vasudevan Nair	91	India	Director, Screenwriter	Oru Vadakkan Veeragatha; Kadavu	
December	26	Dick Capri	93	US	Actor, Comedian	They Still Call Me Bruce; One Angry Man	
December	26	Ney Latorraca	80	Brazil	Actor	Heart and Guts; Carlota Joaquina, Princess of Brazil	
December	27	Dayle Haddon	76	Canada	Actress	The World's Greatest Athlete; North Dallas Forty	
December	27	Olivia Hussey	73	UK	Actress	Romeo and Juliet; Black Christmas	
December	27	Charles Shyer	83	US	Director, Producer, Screenwriter	Private Benjamin; Father of the Bride	
December	28	Jana Synková	80	Czech Republic	Actress	Calamity; Prachy dělaj člověka	
December	29	George Folsey Jr.	85	US	Producer, Film Editor	The Blues Brothers; Coming to America	
December	29	Linda Lavin	87	US	Actress, Singer	See You in the Morning; The Back-up Plan	
December	30	John Capodice	83	US	Actor	Wall Street; Speed	
December	31	Roger Pratt	77	UK	Cinematographer	Brazil; Batman	

== Film debuts ==
- Robert Bobroczkyi – Alien: Romulus
- Marissa Bode – Wicked
- Zoe Bonafonte – The 47
- Lakshya – Kill
- Maisy Stella – My Old Ass
