= Immy Humes =

American documentary filmmaker and television producer

- Born: New York City, United States
- Occupation: documentary filmmaker
- Awards: Nominated for Academy Award for Best Documentary (Short Subject)

Immy Humes is an American documentary filmmaker and television producer. Her first independent documentary was nominated for an Academy Award in 1991, and she continues to make films about contemporary American life. Humes has also taught filmmaking at the New York Film Academy, NYU/Brooklyn Polytechnic and City College of New York.

== Career ==
Early in her career, Humes had determined to make a film biography of her father, Harold L. Humes. Beginning in 1992, Humes began to shoot and collect footage of her sisters, Norman Mailer, Timothy Leary, George Plimpton and others who had known her father well. In 2008, Humes released Doc, which chronicled the life and impact of the influential activist, novelist, and editor. A one-hour version of the 90-minute film ran as an episode of Independent Lens on PBS.

She is currently making a film portrait of the American radical filmmaker Shirley Clarke, in association with Milestone Films and with a grant from the NEA.

After working in television for several years, Humes directed A Little Vicious, a short documentary film about Bandit, a dog who had been sentenced to death for biting. Narrated by actor Kevin Bacon, and featuring dog trainer/philosopher Vicki Hearne, this "offbeat documentary" was lauded by the New York Times reviewer as paying "rewarding attention to the little peculiarities of all involved." The film was nominated for the 1991 Academy Award for Best Documentary (Short Subject).

Humes returned to television as a segment producer for Michael Moore's short-lived TV Nation series. In 1995 Humes released Lizzie Borden Hash & Rehash, a documentary short exploring the strange fascination held by some people for Lizzie Borden, the Massachusetts woman accused but not convicted of killing her parents in 1892.

After working as an associate producer for A Life Apart: Hasidism in America, a film by Menachem Daum and Oren Rudavsky, in 2001 Humes made a documentary on Canadian anthropologist and ethnobotanist Wade Davis for the National Geographic Channel. She made a six-part series on chronic unemployment that ran on Salon in 2012.

== Early life ==
Immy Humes was born and brought up in New York City, one of four daughters of Anna Lou Elianoff and writer Harold L. Humes, co-founder of The Paris Review. Immy graduated with honors from Harvard University in the field of Social Studies, and commenced a media career in filmmaking, interning at Boston's WGBH-TV public television station.
