= Gece =

Gece (Turkish "night") may refer to:

- Gece, 1972 Turkish film with Süleyman Turan List of Turkish films of 1972
- Gece, 2014 Turkish film with Nurgül Yeşilçay
- Gece (band)
- Gece Yolcuları (literally "Night Riders" or "Night Travelers") Turkish soft rock band
