= Hamzaoğlu =

Hamzaoğlu is a Turkish surname. Notable people with the surname include:

- Hamza Hamzaoğlu (born 1970), Turkish footballer
- Hayati Hamzaoğlu (1933–2000), Turkish actor
