= List of Turkish films of 1972 =

In 1972 Turkey was the fourth or third film producer in the world with approximately 300 feature films, including numerous B-movies, spinoffs and remakes. This is a list of the films produced in the country and released during the year 1972:

| Title | Director | Cast | Notes |
|---|---|---|---|
| Acı Yudum | Natuk Baytan | | |
| Acı Zafer | Aykut Düz | | |
| Acı Sevda | | | |
| Acı Pirinç | | | |
| Acı Kader | | | |
| Adanalı Kardeşler | | Halit Akçatepe | |
| Afacan Harika Çocuk (Afakan, the Wonderboy) | Ülkü Erakalın | | |
| Ah Koca Dünya | | | |
| Ahmet Çavuş | | | |
| Arzu İle Kamber | | | |
| Asi Kalpler | | | |
| Asi Gençler | | | |
| Asiler Kampı | | | |
| Asılana Kadar Yaşayacaksın | | | |
| Aslanların Ölümü | | | |
| Aşk Sepeti | | | |
| Aşk Fırtınası | | | |
| Aşk Ve Cinayet Meleği | | | |
| Aşkların En Güzeli | | | |
| Aşka Selam Kavgaya Devam | | | |
| Aşkım Kaderim Oldu | | | |
| Akma Tuna | | | |
| Akrep Mustafa | | | |
| Alçaklar Cehenneme Gider | | | |
| Allahaısmarladık Katil | | | |
| Alın Yazısı | | | |
| Atmaca Mehmet | | | |
| Ay Aman Of | | | |
| Aynı Yolun Yolcusu | | | |
| Ayrılık | | | |
| Azat Kuşu | | | |
| Balıkçı Kız | | | |
| Baskın | | | |
| Bastır Behçet Bastır | | | |
| Battal Gazinin İntikamı | | | |
| Batıda Kan Vardı | | | |
| Behçet Cezayirde | | | |
| Bela Mustafa | | | |
| Belalılar Şehri | | | |
| Belalılar Belalısı | | | |
| Belki Yıllar Sonra | | | |
| Benimle Sevişir Misin | | | |
| Beyaz Kurt | | | |
| Beyoğlu Kan Kokuyor | | | |
| Beyoğlu Kan Kokuyor | | | |
| Bir Baltaya Sap Olamadım | | | |
| Bin Pınar Ki | | | |
| Bir Aşk Bin Ölüm | | | |
| Bir Garip Adam | | | |
| Bir Garip Yolcu | | | |
| Bitirim | | | |
| Bitirim Kemal | | | |
| Bitirimler | | | |
| Biz Belayı Severiz | | | |
| Büyük Bela | | | |
| Büyük Vurgun | | | |
| Bombala Oski Bombala | | | |
| Casus Avcıları | | | |
| Cehenneme Postalarım | | | |
| Cehennemin Beş Delisi | | | |
| Cemo | | | |
| Cesurlar | | | |
| Cevriyenin Kızları | | | |
| Cezanı Çekeceksin | | | |
| Çapulcular | | | |
| Çığlık | | | |
| Çılgınlar Ordusu | | | |
| Çile | | | |
| Çileli Dünye | | | |
| Çoban Ali | | | |
| Çöl Kartalı | | | |
| Dadaloğlunun İntikamı | | | |
| Dağlar Kralı | | | |
| Damdaki Kemancı | | | |
| Darağacı | | | |
| Deli | | | |
| Delioğlan | | | |
| Denizden Gelen Kız | | | |
| Dinmeye Sızı | | | |
| Dişi Akrep | | | |
| Dokunma Ölürsün | | | |
| Don Juan 72 (Çapkınlar Kralı) | | | |
| Dönüş | | | |
| Dudaktan Dudağa Ölüm | | | |
| Ekmekçi Kadın | | | |
| Elveda Yavrum | | | |
| Elif İle Seydo | | | |
| Elveda Meyhaneci | | | |
| Estergon Kalesi | | | |
| Evlat | | | |
| Falcı | | | |
| Fatma Bacı | | | |
| Feryat | | | |
| Fırtına Kemal | | | |
| Fosforlu Melek | | | |
| Gardaş Beni Eversene | | | |
| Gece | | | |
| Gecekondu Rüzgarı | | | |
| Gelinlik Kızlar | | | |
| Çapkın Hafiye | | | |
| Gökçe Çiçek | | | |
| Gönül Oyunu | | | |
| Görevimiz Tehlike | | | |
| Görevimiz Tehlike (Aynı isimde ikinci film) | | | |
| Güllü | | | |
| Gülüzar | | | |
| Gümüş Gerdanlık | | | |
| Günahsızlar | | | |
| Hacı Muratın İntikamı | | | |
| Hacı Ağalar Kralı | | | |
| Hakikat | | | |
| Hayat Mı Bu | | | |
| Hayatımın En Güzel Yılları | | | |
| Hayal Uçurumu | | | |
| Haydut Avcısı | | | |
| Hazreti İbrahim | | | |
| Hedefte Beş Adam | | | |
| Her Şafakta Ölürüm | | | |
| Her Adımım Bela | | | |
| Hesabı Kim Ödeyecek | | | |
| Hesapta Bu Yoktu | | | |
| Hızlı Hızır | | | |
| Irmak | | | |
| İblis | | | |
| İffet Sokağı | | | |
| İki Ateş Arasında | | | |
| İlk Aşk | | | |
| İnsafsız | | | |
| İstanbul Kabadayısı Kara Murat | | | |
| İtham Ediyorum | | | |
| İyi Döverim Kötü Severim | | | |
| Kabadayılar Kralı | | | |
| Kaçak | | | |
| Kader Yolcuları | | | |
| Kaderin Pençesi | | | |
| Kaderin Esiriyiz | | | |
| Kaderimin Oyunu | | | |
| Kadın Yapar | | | |
| Kahbe (Bir Kız Böyle Düştü) | | | |
| Kahbe Tuzağı | | | |
| Kalleşler | | | |
| Kamalının İntikamı | | | |
| Kamçılı Kadın | | | |
| Kan Ve Kin | | | |
| Kan Dökmez Remzi | | | |
| Kan İzleri Örttü | | | |
| Kanlı Değirmen | | | |
| Kanlı Öc | | | |
| Kanlı Para | | | |
| Kanun Adamı | | | |
| Kadersizler | | | |
| Kanun Pençesi | | | |
| Kaplan Kadın Dehşet Adasında | | | |
| Kara Bela | | | |
| Kara Şeytan | | | |
| Kara Duvak | | | |
| Kara Batur | | | |
| Karaoğlan Geliyor | | | |
| Kara Murat: Fatih'in Fedaisi | | | |
| Kara Doğan | | | |
| Kara Bomba | | | |
| Karamanın Koyunu | | | |
| Karmen | | | |
| Kartal Tepe | | | |
| Kefenin Cebi Yok | | | |
| Keloğlanla Can Kız | | | |
| Katerina 72 | | | |
| Kırbaçlı Yosma | | | |
| Kırk Yalan Memiş | | | |
| Kırık Merdiven | | | |
| Kırık Hayat | | | |
| Köpekler | | | |
| Kopuk | | | |
| Korku Çemberi | | | |
| Korkusuz Beşler | | | |
| Kozalı Gelin | | | |
| Korkunç Tecavüz | | | |
| Korkusuz Aşıklar | | | |
| Köle | | | |
| Kuduzlar | | | |
| Kurban | | | |
| Kurt Bey | | | |
| Leyla İle Mecnun | | | |
| Mahkum | | | |
| Merhaba Tatlım | | | |
| Mustafam | | | |
| Murat İle Nazlı | | | |
| Müthiş Darbe | | | |
| Namus | | | |
| Namus Kurşunu | | | |
| O Ağacaın Altında | | | |
| Ocak Söndürenler | | | |
| Oğlum | | | |
| Öfke | | | |
| Öldüren Örümcek | | | |
| Ölür Müsün, Öldürür Müsün | | | |
| Ölüm Bebekleri | | | |
| Ölüm Dönemeci | | | |
| Ölüm Elçileri | | | |
| Ölüm Kanunu | | | |
| Ölüm Korkusu | | | |
| Öldüren Takip | | | |
| Ölüme Son Adım | | | |
| Öldüren Darbe | | | |
| Ölüme Yaklaşma | | | |
| Ölmek Var Dönmek Yok | | | |
| Ölüme Köprü | | | |
| Ölüm Saçtılar | | | |
| Öldüren Şarkı | | | |
| Ölüme Sevişenler | | | |
| Ölüm Nöbet Bekliyor | | | |
| Ölümle Uğraşanlar | | | |
| Ölüm Benden Korksun | | | |
| Ölüm Peşimizde | | Fatma Girik | |
| Örümcek | | | |
| Paprika Gaddarın Aşkı | | | |
| Para | | | |
| Parçala Behçet | | | |
| Parola Yıldırım | | | |
| Rüyalar Gerçek Olsa | | | |
| Saby Kahraman Korsan | | | |
| Sabu Hırsızlar Prensi | | | |
| Sahtekar | | | |
| Sarı Öküz Parası | | | |
| Savulun Geliyorum | | | |
| Satılık Kadın | | | |
| Seks Ve Cinayet | | | |
| Sen Alın Yazımsın | | | |
| Serseri Kral | | | |
| Sev Dedi Gözlerim | | | |
| Sev Kardeşim | | | |
| Sevgili Hocam | | | |
| Sezercik Aslan Parçası | | | |
| Sisli Hatıralar | | | |
| Suçlu | | | |
| Suya Düşen Hayal | | | |
| Süper Adam Kadınlar Arasında | | | |
| Süper Kadın Dehşet Saçıyor | | | |
| Süper Adam İstanbulda | | | |
| Süpürgesi Yoncadan | | | |
| Süreyya | | | |
| Son Durak Ölüm | | | |
| Son Duanı Et | | | |
| Son Düello | | | |
| Şafakta Vuruşanlar | | | |
| Şahmeran | | | |
| Şehmuz | | | |
| Şehvet | | | |
| Şehvet Kurbanı | | | |
| Şeytan Pençesi | | | |
| Şeytan Tırnağı | | | |
| Şeytan Buradan Geçti | | | |
| Şeytan Kan Kusturacak | | | |
| Tahir İle Zühre | | | |
| Takip | | | |
| Tam İsabet | | | |
| Tanrı Misafiri | | | |
| Tarkan: Altın Madalyon | | | |
| Tatlı Dillim | | | |
| Tehlikeli Görev | | | |
| Tekrar Güneş Doğacak | | | |
| Tophaneli Murat | | | |
| Tövbekar | | | |
| Tuzsuz Deli Bekir | | | |
| Uçurum | | | |
| Uçan Kız | | | |
| Ustura Behçet | | | |
| Utanç | | | |
| Üç Kağıtçılar | | | |
| Üç Mahkum | | | |
| Üç Silahşörler | | | |
| Üç Silahşörlerin İntikamı | | | |
| Üç Sevgili | | | |
| Vahşetin Esirleri | | | |
| Vahşi Bir Kız Sevdim | | | |
| Vahşi Arzu | | | |
| Vahşi Ve Güzel | | | |
| Vahşi Aşk | | | |
| Valizdeki Ceset | | | |
| Ve Güneşe Kan Sıçardı | | | |
| Ve Silahını Çekti | | | |
| Ver Allahım Ver | | | |
| Vur | | | |
| Vur Vur Kaç Kaç | | | |
| Vur Gardaş Vur | | | |
| Vur Kır Geç | | | |
| Vurgun | | | |
| Vukuat Var | | | |
| Vurma Zalim Vurma | | | |
| Yağma Hasan'ın Böreği | | | |
| Ya Sev Ya Öldür | | | |
| Yalan Dünya | | | |
| Yaralı Kurt | | | |
| Yazık Oldu Aliye | | | |
| Yedi Kişi Ölecek | | | |
| Yıldırım Ajan | | | |
| Yılmayan Şeytan | | | |
| Yiğitlerin Kaderi | | | |
| Yirmi Yıl Sonra | | | |
| Yumurcak Küçük Şahit | | | |
| Zehra | | | |
| Zorbanın Aşkı | | Ismet Ay | |
| Zulüm | | | |

== See also ==
- 1972 in Turkey
