= Kerim Afşar =

Turkish actor

- Born: 13 August 1930; Istanbul, Turkey
- Died: 26 September 2003 (aged 73); Ankara, Turkey
- Occupation: Actor
- Years active: 1951–2003
- Spouses: Esin Afşar (m. 1958): Leyla Afşar
- Children: 1 daughter

Kerim Afşar (13 August 1930 – 26 September 2003) was a Turkish actor who played various roles in theater, movies and TV series. During his career, the actor also directed several movies and also played as voice actor in some of his movies.

== Biography ==
He was graduated from Ankara State Conservatory in 1953. Due to WW2 Afşar and his family moved to Gelibolu. He started his career by performed in various plays even before his graduation in 1952. His first role was "Oberon" character in A Midsummer Night's Dream play written by Carl Elberth. He played in many characters and acted as voice actor in "Radio Theater" programs in TRT (Turkish TV channel). In 1980, he continued his career in Berlin, Germany by the invitation of Peter Stein in order to play in his plays. After returning to Turkey, he joined in Ankara Art Theater (AST) and continued to his career here while also performing in Istanbul City Theater. Afşar died on September 26, 2003.

== Selected filmography ==
- Yaprak Dökümü - 1988
- Perry Mason - 1983
- Mine - 1982
- Çekiç ve Titreşim - 1979
- Emekli Başkan - 1979
- Isı - 1979
- Kuma - 1979
- Arkadaş - 1974
- Mevlana - 1973
- Battal Gazi Destanı - 1971
- Yılan Soyu - 1969
- Çalıkuşu - 1966
