= Meral Zeren =

Turkish actress

- Born: 1956 (age 69–70); Urfa or Istanbul, Turkey (Note: The place and the date of her birth are inconsistent throughout the sources.)
- Occupation: Actress
- Years active: 1971 onward
- Known for: Salako (1975), Yanaşma (1973), Baba bizi eversene (1975), Hanzo (1975)

Meral Zeren (born 1956) is a Turkish actress. She was popular during the early 1970s and collaborated with well-known actors of that era.

== Early life ==
Meral Zeren's birthname was Çiğdem Gümüş and although her early life started on bad terms, according to the widespread view that while her mother was pregnant she learned of her husband's affairs. She left her husband Diyarbakır and moved to Istanbul, where Zeren was born,although other sources disagree.

Zeren received her primary and secondary education in Istanbul, leaving before she grauated. She made herself a place when she was 15 by singing on stages and caught attention of film directors such as Atıf Yılmaz and Memduh Ün, who introduced her to the big screen.

Zeren's film debut came in Önce Vur sonra Sev(1971). She then appeared in other films opposite to actors such as Kemal Sunal (Salako, Hanzo), Cüneyt Arkın (Yanaşma), Barış Manço(Baba bizi eversene).

== Selected filmography ==
- 1971 Önce vur sonra sev
- 1971 Alaaddin'in Lambası
- 1971 Battal Gazi Destanı
- 1972 Battal Gazi'nin intikamı
- 1972 Kanlı Para
- 1972 Çöl Kartalı
- 1972 Üç sevgili
- 1972 Dadaloğlu'nun Intikamı
- 1972 Karaoğlan Geliyor
- 1973 Bitirim Kardeşler
- 1973 Yanaşma
- 1974 Salak Milyoner
- 1974 Enayi
- 1974 From the Village to the city
- 1974 Salako
- 1975 Hanzo
- 1975 Şaşkın damat
- 1975 Salak Bacılar
- 1976 Nereye bakıyor bu adamlar
- 1978 Aşk ve Adalet
- 1980 Banker Bilo
- 1984 Şaşkın Gelin
- 1994 Tehlikeli Kadın
- 1995 Polis dosyası
- 1996 Zehirli Çiçek
- 2000 Karlar Eriyince
- 2001 Kardakiler
- 2002 Kenar Mahalle
- 2003 Sen hiç Güneşte Üşüdünmü?
- 2006 Eden bulur

== Recognition ==
- 2012, 49.Golden Orange Film Festival- Lifetime Honor award
