= Harold L. Humes =

American literati (1926–1992)

- Born: May 11, 1926; Douglas, Arizona, U.S.
- Died: September 10, 1992 (aged 66); New York City, U.S.
- Education: MIT, undergrad, not completed; Harvard University (Adjunct of Arts, 1954)
- Occupations: Novelist; Journalist; Editor-in-chief; Teacher

Harold Louis "Doc" Humes Jr. (May 11, 1926 – September 10, 1992) was an American author, journalist, and founding editor of The Paris Review. In 1966, in London, he took large amounts of LSD given to him by Timothy Leary, and he became paranoid and sometimes delusional. After this, he no longer published any writing. When he returned to the United States in 1969, he reinvented himself as a "guru on campus", a self-appointed visiting professor, and spent the next twenty-odd years living on or near campus at Columbia University, Princeton University, Bennington College, Monmouth University, and Harvard University, dependent on both his family and students who were fascinated by his mixture of erudition and mental illness.

== Early life ==
Humes was born in Douglas, Arizona. His father was a chemical engineer from Michigan who studied at McGill University. His mother, Alexandra Elizabeth McGonnigle, came from Montreal. Both parents were Christian Science practitioners.

Humes grew up in Princeton, New Jersey, and graduated from Princeton High School. It was there that he won his lifelong nickname: his classmates dubbed him Doc after "Doc Huer", a brilliant scientist/nutty professor in Buck Rogers, a popular comic strip.

He attended MIT and did a stint in the United States Navy, but left in 1948 to go to Paris.

== Work ==
In Paris, Humes owned an English-language magazine called The Paris News Post, edited by Leon Kafka. Humes recruited the American Peter Matthiessen as literary editor, not knowing until much later that Matthiessen was working for the CIA at the time. Together they founded The Paris Review, a literary journal, and soon brought in George Plimpton, who would remain its editor for fifty years.

After returning to the United States, Humes studied fiction writing with Archibald MacLeish at Harvard Extension School, ultimately graduating with an Adjunct in Arts degree (equivalent to a standard baccalaureate degree) in 1954.

He wrote two novels, The Underground City (Random House, 1958) and Men Die (Random House, 1959). Esquire magazine mentioned Humes, along with John Updike and William Styron, among the nation's most promising young novelists.

He also directed Don Peyote, a movie starring Ojo de Vidrio, and designed and built a paper house, which he hoped would be an affordable housing alternative.

Humes was reputed to have worked for several years as a meteorologist in London.

He managed Lord Buckley, the spoken-word artist; fought the New York City Police Department over the Cabaret Card Laws; and was Norman Mailer's campaign manager for Mailer's first run for New York City mayor—a campaign that was aborted by Mailer's stabbing of his wife.

In 1964, Humes wrote a paper entitled "Bernoulli's Epitaph" proposing that the universe was shaped like a spherical vortex and noting that a cross-section of a spherical vortex looks like a yin-yang symbol.

He started a third novel, titled The Memoirs of Dorsey Slade, but never finished it.

By 1967, Humes had developed a detoxification method for heroin addiction that involved, in his terms, microdoses of LSD, medical-grade hashish, emergency massage techniques, flotation exercises and breath work. He claimed that, if done correctly, the method would lead to a "rebirthing" experience over 3–5 days. He was practicing these techniques in what he termed 'crash-pad clinics' in Rome, Italy.

By 1968, he was in Paris just in time to be jailed during the demonstrations that were part of the student revolution.

He was back in the United States by April 1969, when he gave away many thousands of dollars in cash on and around the Columbia University campus.

The novelist Paul Auster described him as "a ravaged, burnt-out writer who had run aground on the shoals of his own consciousness." Humes once camped on Auster's sofa and stayed there until he was politely nudged along. He would "wheel around and start addressing total strangers, breaking off in midsentence to slap another fifty-dollar bill in someone's hand and urge him to spend it like there was no tomorrow."

Humes also frequented the Princeton University campus in the spring of 1970. He would entertain groups of students with elaborately wrought, delusional accounts of the F.I.D.O. computer system (a supposed underground maze of interconnected computers, run by the government); of disappearing and reappearing "lenticular" clouds (claimed by Humes to be heat sinks for alien UFOs); and of systems for decoding the supposed hidden messages embedded in the "snow" that would fill a television screen after a broadcast television station had signed off for the night.

Commercial mortgage broker Olen Soifer confirms Humes' presence as a "drop-in" at his apartment in West Long Branch, New Jersey, in the spring of 1970: "Three of us shared a 1-BR apartment while attending Monmouth College (now Monmouth University) that semester. We picked up 'Doc' when he was hitch-hiking, and took him back to our apartment because he had no place to stay...and that extended into him "crashing" with us for months. He regaled us with stories about himself: that he had attended M.I.T.; that he had invented and promoted paper houses; that he was a published author; that he had founded The Paris Review; that he was an associate of (and had taken LSD with) Timothy Leary; that the government was spying on him; and so on. But, while he intrigued us, we thought, at first, that these were the ravings of a lunatic...though, an appealing one. Then, a roommate, Michael, started researching 'Doc' and, much to our utter amazement, we found out that most, if not all, of these "fantasies" were completely true. Active in the anti-Vietnam movement, we all found ourselves at an antiwar rally at Princeton U. on May 4, 1970. During the rally, the news came through of the Kent State shootings. As the crowd was told that one, then 2, 3 and 4 students had been shot dead by the US National Guard, the enraged crowd was all set to march en masse to, and burn down, the ROTC building at Princeton...and 'Doc' proved his ability to influence us. Without warning, he leaped up onto the speakers' stage and exhorted the crowd to: "Stop! Think! What you are about to do! Such an act will only demonstrate the shootings might be appropriate retaliation for that very sort of action." And, with a few words, he caused us to "think twice" and he restrained us from such violence. Some time after that day, by the end of the semester, 'Doc' "split" and we never saw him again!"

After Humes's death, records obtained through a Freedom of Information Act request by his daughter, Immy Humes, revealed that the U.S. government had been spying on him from 1948 to 1977, perhaps implying that his paranoia had more basis in fact than previously assumed.

== Personal life ==
In 1954, he married Anna Lou Elianoff, daughter of linen designer Luba Elianoff. They had four daughters. She divorced him in 1966; in 1967, she married Nelson W. Aldrich Jr., who had worked at The Paris Review as an editor.

In 1968, he had a son in Italy. In 1977, he had another son, artist Devin Lomon-Humes, with cellist Glynis Lomonn; Lomon-Humes was born in Cambridge, Massachusetts.

Humes died of prostate cancer at St. Rose's Home in New York City in 1992.

== Philosophical and political views ==
Humes was a passionate and early advocate of medical marijuana. In later years, when recounting his memories of MIT, he spoke especially highly of his professor Norbert Wiener, the author of the book Cybernetics.

== Bibliography ==
- The Underground City (Random House, 1958) (Random House, 2007)
- Men Die (Random House, 1959) (Random House, 2007)

== Sources ==
- Orlando Sentinel
- New York Times
