= Vellarikka Pattanam =

- Directed by: Thomas Berly
- Written by: Thomas Berly; Nelson (dialogues)
- Screenplay by: Thomas Berly
- Produced by: Thomas Berly; Abraham Tharakan
- Starring: Prem Nazir; Sukumari; Jagathy Sreekumar; Manavalan Joseph
- Cinematography: Ramachandra Babu
- Edited by: K. K. Balan
- Music by: Thomas Berly
- Production company: Amaravathi Creations
- Distributed by: Amaravathi Creations
- Release date: 4 January 1985
- Country: India
- Language: Malayalam

Vellarikka Pattanam is a 1985 Indian Malayalam film, directed and produced by Thomas Berly. The film stars Prem Nazir, Sukumari, Jagathy Sreekumar and Manavalan Joseph in the lead roles. It is the last film where Prem Nazir appears as a hero. The film has musical score by Thomas Berly.

== Plot ==
The night of the funeral of their father, Kuriakose, brothers Alex and Stephen are attacked by goons at their home. They escape via different routes – Alex impersonates a drunk political leader while Stephen hides out in a nunnery. The mystery deepens when Stephen finds another man, Thomas Kuruvilla, who bears a striking resemblance to their father and died under similar circumstances only a day earlier.

== Cast ==
- Prem Nazir as Alex
- Sukumari
- Jagathy Sreekumar as Porinju
- Manavalan Joseph as Sub Inspector Hitlar Jose
- Ratheesh as Stephen
- Shubha as Sathyabhama
- Prathapachandran as Kuriakose / Thomas Kuruvilla
- C. P. Antony
- Kundara Johnny as Muthu
- Lalithasree as Mariyamma
- Mala Aravindan
- Philomina
- Sabitha Anand as Shobha
- Seema as Sophie
- Thodupuzha Vasanthi
- Thrissur Elsy

== Soundtrack ==
The music was composed by Thomas Berly and the lyrics were written by Nelson.

No.	Song	Singers	Lyrics	Length (m:ss)
1	"Hemantha Kalam"	K. J. Yesudas	Nelson	
2	"Mangalangal"	Unni Menon, Chorus, C. O. Anto, Lathika	Nelson	
3	"Romaancham Poothirangum"	K. J. Yesudas	Nelson	
