= Erden Alkan =

Actor

- Born: 12 February 1941 (age 85); Giresun, Turkey
- Occupation: Actor
- Years active: 1970–present

Erden Alkan (born 12 February 1941) is a Turkish actor living in Germany. He studied at the Max Reinhardt Theatre School in Vienna after graduating from Vefa High School in Istanbul.

== Filmography ==
Film
Year	Film	Role	Notes
2018	Deliler	Demirci	
2012	Conquest 1453	Chandarly Halil Pasha	
2008	Evet, I Do!	Ayhan	
2003	Gate to Heaven	Forman Kaygun	
1999	Lola + Bilidikid	Taxi driver	
1987	Insan Avcilari	(uncredited)	
1973	Gönülden Yaralilar	Kenan	
1971	Battal Gazi Destanı	Kiryos Alyson	
2014	Diriliş: Ertuğrul	Çandar Bey	
