= Battal Gazi Destanı =

- Directed by: Atıf Yılmaz
- Written by: Ayşe Şasa
- Produced by: Memduh Ün
- Starring: Cüneyt Arkın; Fikret Hakan; Meral Zeren; Kerim Afşar; Reha Yurdakul; Erden Alkan; Melek Görgün; Ali Taygun; Aynur Akarsu
- Release date: 1 November 1971
- Running time: 85 minutes
- Country: Turkey
- Language: Turkish

Battal Gazi Destanı (Battal Ghazi Legend) is a 1971 Turkish historic action film. Starring Cüneyt Arkın, it is a depiction of the life of the legendary Muslim Serdar of Malatya, Battal Gazi. Moreover, it is the first one of four "Battal Gazi" series and one of the numerous historic movies of Cüneyt Arkın.

== Plot ==
Hüseyin Gazi, the father of Battal Gazi, is killed in an ambush by three Byzantine warlords. His son decides to take revenge. Two of the warlords are rather easy targets and Battal manages to eliminate them but the last warlord turns out to be the Byzantine Emperor, Leon. In his journey, Battal faces with the greatest Christian knight, Hammer. After a fight between the two, Hammer loses and converts to Islam and becomes the best friend of Battal Gazi.

The film carries on the classical patterns of the Turkish cinema in many fields. First, there are clear prejudices about the Byzantine side. They are depicted as vandals. Second, there is a couple of battles where Battal fights against a whole army and defeats them all. Third, the fancy medieval costumes, like plumed helmets, are present in the film too. It is also a well known film for its quotes which are even used as samples in songs. The most famous one is being "Ben senin kancık kelleni ödlek bedeninden ayırmaya geldim!" (I came here to sever your bitchy head off your cowardly body!).

Another setback in the film is the depiction of Battal Ghazi as a Turcoman. While, there is a possibility of such a thing, Battal was probably an Arab. Malatya wouldn't fall under the Turkic control until the arrival of Seljuks in the 11th century. Still, the film is a popular milestone in the "wave of history" in the Turkish cinema between the late 1960s and early 1980s.

== Cast ==
- Cüneyt Arkın as Battal Gazi / Hüseyin Gazi
- Fikret Hakan as Ahmet Turani / Hammer
- Meral Zeren as Ayşe
- Reha Yurdakul as Hileryon
- Kerim Afşar as Imperator Leon
- Melek Görgün as Irene
- Aynur Akarsu as Faustina
- Erden Alkan as Delibaş Kiryos Alyon
- Ali Taygun as Bizans Kargası Polemon
- Niyazi Er as Budala Testor
- Ekrem Gökkaya as Vezir Abdusselam
- Atıf Kaptan as Ömer Bey
- Baki Tamer as Tevabil Usta
