= Double Barrel (2015 film) =

- Theatrical release poster
- Directed by: Lijo Jose Pellissery
- Written by: Lijo Jose Pellissery
- Produced by: Prithviraj Sukumaran; Santhosh Sivan; Arya; Shaji Nadesan; Lijo Jose Pellissery
- Starring: Prithviraj Sukumaran; Indrajith Sukumaran; Arya; Chemban Vinod Jose; Sunny Wayne; Swathi Reddy; Isha Sharvani
- Cinematography: Abinandhan Ramanujam
- Edited by: Manoj; Sathyaraj Natarajan
- Music by: Prashant Pillai
- Production companies: August Cinema; Amen Movie Monastery
- Release date: 28 August 2015
- Running time: 160 minutes
- Country: India
- Language: Malayalam
- Budget: ₹16 crore (US$1.7 million)

Double Barrel is a 2015 Indian Malayalam-language parody gangster film written, directed, and co-produced by Lijo Jose Pellissery. It was jointly produced by August Cinema and Amen Movie Monastery. The film stars an ensemble cast, including Prithviraj Sukumaran, Indrajith Sukumaran, Arya, Chemban Vinod Jose, Sunny Wayne, Swathi Reddy, Isha Sharvani, Vijay Babu, Poornima Indrajith, Anil Radhakrishnan Menon, Thomas Berly, Sherrin Varghese, Sabumon Abdusamad, Rachana Narayanankutty, Anil Murali, Asif Ali, and Pearle Maaney. Prashant Pillai composed the music, while the cinematography and editing were handled by Abinandhan Ramanujam and Manoj-Sathyaraj Natarajan.

Double Barrel was released on 28 August 2015. It mostly received mixed to negative reviews from critics and disappointed at the box office.

== Plot ==
Laila and Majnu are two precious stones which have value only if they are together. The stones are now possessed by a crime boss called "Don" in Goa, who tries to sell them in order not to lose them to his son, Gabbar, whom he despises. Don approaches two experienced gangsters named Pancho and Vinci and offers them the stones for ₹10 crore, and the duo agrees and asks for a week's time to arrange the money. Gabbar's underboss, Billy, learns about this and offers Pancho and Vinci ₹100 crores to buy the stones. Pancho and Vinci get ₹5 crore from Blacky, which actually belongs to the Tarkovs, a Russian mob in Goa. For the remaining ₹5 crore, they plan to rob the black money of Podiyadis, a local hawala gang in Kerala. While the deal happens, things get mixed up, which leads to a big gang war between all the groups. However, Pancho and Vinchi escape from the gang war with the money and join Laila and Majnu.

== Cast ==
- Prithviraj Sukumaran as Pancho
- Indrajith Sukumaran as Vinci
- Arya as Majnu
- Sunny Wayne as Silent
- Chemban Vinod Jose as Diesel
- Master Varghese as Kid
- Isha Sharvani as Shaolin Sweety
- Swathi Reddy as Laila
- Pearle Maaney as She (young couple wife)
- Vijay Babu as Billy
- Steev Thekkanath as Gabbar, Don's son
- Asif Ali as He (young couple husband)
- Thomas Berly as Don
- Sherrin Varghese as Tarkov
- Parvathi Menon as Lady Tarkov
- Poornima Indrajith as Smitha
- Anil Radhakrishnan Menon as Mario Benzo/Boss
- Bineesh Kodiyeri as Vincent
- Sajid Yahiya as Chaplie
- Anil Murali as Podiyadi Soman
- Sabumon Abdusamad as Podiyadi Martin
- Rachana Narayanankutty as Kochumary
- Manesh Kumar as Ummer
- John as Blacky
- Shaji Nadesan as Unnibaby
- Sujith Vasudev as Husband at hotel, Kid's father
- Muthumani as Wife at Hotel, Kid's mother
- Baiju Thekkekara as Jesus
- Sunny as Uncle Django

== Production ==
Double Barrel was announced on 2014 as a gangster comedy movie in the backdrop of Goa, starring brothers Prithviraj and Indrajith Sukumaran. The climax was shot using four Red Dragon 6K cameras. Double Barrel was made at an estimated cost of ₹16 crore (US$1.7 million).

== Release ==
Double Barrel was released in theatres on 28 August 2015. Surya TV and Sun NXT bought the satellite and digital rights.

=== Critical reception ===
Asha Prakash of The Times of India gave 2.5 out of 5 stars and wrote "Other than the visual spectacle of seeing some major actors in the industry in their clownish avatars in the most impressive of settings, there is nothing much to engage the viewer. The shooting and killing seem never-ending and the jokes tedious". Veeyen of Nowrunning.com gave 1.5 out of 5 stars and criticized the script, musical score, humour and direction, while concluding as "'Double Barrel' sends the spoof genre on a downward spiral with a relentlessly unexciting script. Real crazy indeed".

Moviebuzz of Sify heavily criticized the film and described it as a "flawed experiment", adding that, "The script is messy and some of the characters are so badly written that they just come and go in between without any impact in the whole narrative. The overindulgence of the makers is evident, ignoring the hapless viewers in the process". IndiaGlitz.com gave 1.5 out of 5 stars and wrote "'Double Barrel' not only is the content insane, so is the presentation", and said that the film fails to engage.

== Soundtrack ==
Double Barrel

Soundtrack album by Prashant Pillai
- Released: August 26, 2015
- Genre: Feature film soundtrack
- Length: 26:51
- Label: Orange Music
- Producer: Prashant Pillai

Prashant Pillai chronology
Chandrettan Evideya (2015)	Double Barrel (2015)	Rockstar (2015)

Prashant Pillai, who had composed for all of Lijo Jose Pelliserry's earlier films, composed the songs and background score of the film.

Double Barrel track listing
No.	Title	Lyrics	Artist(s)	Length
1.	"Athala Pithala"	Shabaraeesh Varma	Arun Kamath, Shabaraeesh Varma, Rahul R. Govinda, Gagan Baderiya	03:19
2.	"Om Hare"	P. S. Rafeeque	Franco	03:30
3.	"Amour Amour"	Gilles Denizot (French), Prashant Pillai (English)	Gilles Denizot	04:57
4.	"Mohabbat"	P. S. Rafeeque	Shahabaz Aman, Preeti Pilai	03:45
5.	"Selfie"	Shabaraeesh Varma	Shabaraeesh Varma, K. S. Krishnan, Prashant Pillai	02:45
6.	"Kadala Varuthu"	Shabaraeesh Varma	Shabaraeesh Varma	02:36
7.	"Bum Attam"	K. S. Krishnan	K. S. Krishnan	02:51
8.	"Shakeela"		Prashant Pillai, Gagan Baderiya	04:40
9.	"Athala Pithala Reprise"	Shabaraeesh Varma	Arun Kamath, Shabareesh Varma	01:58
Total length:				26:51
