= Elie Wiesel: Soul on Fire =

2024 documentary film by Oren Rudavsky

Elie Wiesel: Soul on Fire is a 2024 documentary film which explores the life of Holocaust survivor, writer and political activist Elie Wiesel. It was directed by Oren Rudavsky.
