= A Little Vicious =

1991 film

- Directed by: Immy Humes
- Produced by: Immy Humes
- Narrated by: Kevin Bacon
- Edited by: Douglas Cheek
- Production companies: Film and Video Workshop
- Distributed by: Carousel Film & Video
- Release date: May 22, 1991 (New York City)
- Running time: 30 minutes
- Country: United States
- Language: English

A Little Vicious is a 1991 American short documentary film directed by Immy Humes about a dog in Connecticut about to be killed for biting people, until animal trainer Vicki Hearne steps in to help. It was nominated for an Academy Award for Best Documentary Short. It later aired on the PBS series POV.
