= Ferenc Elek =

Hungarian actor

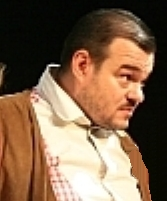
- Born: 3 June 1974 (age 51); Budapest, Hungary
- Occupation: Actor
- Years active: 1987-present

Ferenc Elek (born 3 June 1974) is a Hungarian actor. He appeared in more than ninety films since 1987. He is best known for his performance as Zoli in Question in Details.

== Early life ==
His biological father emigrated to Austria before he was born. He received the surname Elek after his first foster father. He graduated from a vocational secondary school, but did not practice his profession as a mechanic. From there, he went to college, where he graduated in 1998. He was immediately contracted by the Katona József Theater, of which he has been a member ever since. He also regularly undertakes tasks in independent, alternative theatrical companies.
