= Question in Details =

2010 Hungarian romantic drama film

- Köntörfalak
- Directed by: Zsombor Dyga
- Screenplay by: Zsombor Dyga
- Produced by: Ferenc Elek; István Major; György Durst
- Starring: Kátya Tompos; Ferenc Elek; Roland Rába
- Cinematography: Gábor Marosi
- Edited by: Judit Czakó
- Production company: FilmTeam
- Distributed by: FilmTeam
- Release date: February 11, 2010 (Hungary)
- Running time: 80 minutes
- Country: Hungary
- Language: Hungarian

Question in Details (Hungarian: Köntörfalak) is a 2010 Hungarian romantic drama film directed by Zsombor Dyga, starring Ferenc Elek, Kátya Tompos and Roland Rába. It tells the story of a man and a woman who has been on a less than successful dinner date and continue to talk throughout the night. The film was released in Hungary on 11 February 2010.

== Cast ==
- Ferenc Elek as Zoli
- Kátya Tompos as Eszti
- Roland Rába as Gábor
- Tamara Zsigmond as Böbe
- Szilárd Wass as Dex
- Marcell Váczy as Balázs
- Maxim Váczy as Bence
- Zoltán Belényi as Alex
- Sarolta Bodó as Vera

== Reception ==
Origo's Bori Bujdosó compared the film to Richard Linklater's Tape, which has a similar chamber play setting, and wrote that although this is nothing new in cinema, it has rarely been done before in a Hungarian film. She wrote that the film contains "Hollywood clichés" but complemented the pace and dialogues.

Lynden Barber of Australia's Special Broadcasting Service wrote:

For its first two thirds Dyga successfully keeps his drama aloft, aided by two exemplary performances and a directorial approach that privileges cinema rather than the filmed play the material might suggest. Sadly, though, when Eszti’s celebrity chef brother Gabor (Roland Rába) returns home, the story tosses away its credibility by relying on an outlandish coincidence that is meant to carry the force of revelation. ... Gábor Marosi's cinematography is burnished and moody, though this too-dark transfer annoyingly loses the image entirely in a few spots.
