= Kátya Tompos =

Hungarian actress (1983–2024)

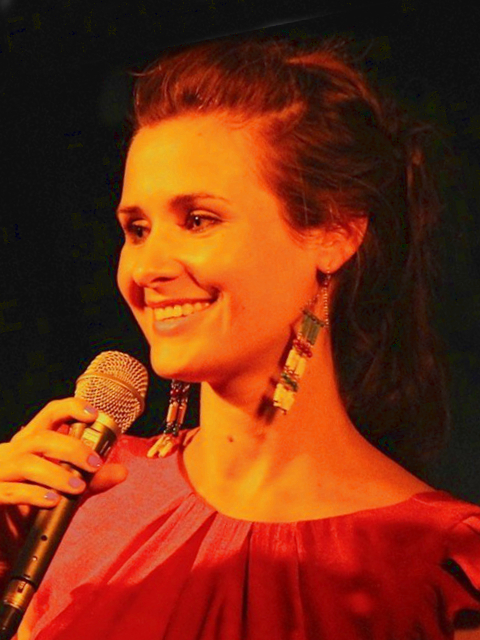
- Tompos in 2015
- Born: Katalin Tompos; 13 March 1983; Budapest, Hungary
- Died: 31 May 2024 (aged 41); Budapest, Hungary
- Occupations: Actress; singer
- Years active: 2001–2024

Katalin "Kátya" Tompos (13 March 1983 – 31 May 2024) was a Hungarian actress and singer known for her theatrical and film roles as well as for her often ethnically themed musical performances.

== Life and career ==
Tompos was supposed to represent Hungary at the Eurovision Song Contest 2009 with the song "Magányos csónak". However, on 10 February 2009, Tompos announced her withdrawal from the 2009 Eurovision Song Contest due to theatrical commitments.

In 2021, she was diagnosed with a rare form of cancer, the treatments for which proved so demanding that they prevented her from performing live from there onwards. Her diagnosis was announced in May 2024. She died one day after a successful fundraising event organised by fellow actors and musicians in order to provide funds for her further treatments that were not available in Hungary.

Tompos died from cancer on 31 May 2024, at the age of 41.

== Filmography ==
- Most van most (2019)
- Valami Amerika 3 (2018)
- Mindig veled (2014)
- Coming Out (2013) - Linda
- Nejem, nőm, csajom (2012)
- Question in Details (Köntörfalak) (2010) - Eszti
- Magic Boys (2009)
- Poligamy (2009) – Lilla
- Valami Amerika 2 (2008) – Vivi
- Kire ütött ez a gyerek? (2007) - Borinka
- Decameron 2007 (2007)
- Örkény lexikon (2006)
- Bianco (2006)
- Régimódi történet (2006) - Kislenke
- A gyertyák csonkig égnek (2005)
- Melletted (2005)
- Szerelem meghal (2003) - Hajnal
- Ébrenjárók (2002)
- Kulcslyukon surranó szerelem (2002)
- VII. Olivér (2001)

== Awards ==
- Bárka Theatre - The best actress (public choice) 2007
- Erzsi Máté award 2005
