= Thomas Berly =

Indian actor (1932–2024)

- Born: Thomas Burleigh Kurishingal; 1 September 1932; Fort Cochin, Madras Presidency, British India
- Died: 16 December 2024 (aged 92); Ernakulam, Kochi, Kerala, India
- Occupation: Actor
- Years active: 1938–1984; 2015
- Spouse: Sophy
- Children: 3
- Parent(s): K. J. Burleigh, Annie

Thomas Burleigh Kurishingal (1 September 1932 – 16 December 2024), better known as Thomas Berly, was an Indian actor, director, producer, script writer, music composer in Malayalam cinema, and author in English.

== Life and career ==
Berly was born at Fort Cochin, Madras Presidency, British India on 1 September 1932. His parents were K. J. Burleigh of the Kurishingal house, an independence activist, and Annie Burleigh, a leader of the pre-independence era who led a satyagraha against toddy shops in Fort Cochin. His debut movie was Thiramala in 1953 as a 21 year old perhaps becoming one of the youngest heroes in Malayalam film industry at that time. He later went to do a course on acting in University of California, Los Angeles. There he acted in a few English movies and television series in small roles. He acted in a Hollywood movie Never So Few in 1959. He produced an English movie, Maya for children. He was also interested in magic, violin, Madeleine instrumental music and painting. His painting Galiyan was selected and shown on International festivals.

Later in 1969 he came back and started seafood exporting business. In 1973 he directed a movie, Ithu Manushyano?. Popular song Sughamoru bindu dukhamoru bindu is from this movie. Then he directed Vellarikkaappattanam in 1985 with veteran actor Prem Nazir as hero. He published a collection of English writings to his credit Beyond Heart (published 2000), which is prose-poetry, Fragrant Petals (2004), in memory of his father. He has also published a cartoon book, O Kerala (2007). and Sacred Savage, a historical novel (2017). He was married to Sophy. They have three children, Tanya, Tarun and Tamina and three grandchildren Tahir, Kiara and Kayaan. He was residing at his family home in Fort Kochi, Kerala.

Berly died while undergoing treatment at a private hospital in Ernakulam, on 16 December 2024, at the age of 92.

== Filmography ==
=== As an actor ===
- Thiramaala (1953)
- Double Barrel (2015)

=== Direction ===
- Ithu Manushyano (1973)
- Vellarikkaappattanam (1985)

=== Story ===
- Ithu Manushyano? (1973)
- Vellarikkaappattanam (1985)

=== Screenplay ===
- Ithu Manushyano? (1973)
- Vellarikkaappattanam (1985)

=== Production ===
- Ithu Manushyano? (1973)
- Vellarikkaappattanam (1985)

=== Dialogue ===
- Ithu Manushyano? (1973)

=== Music ===
- "Mangalangal"... Vellarikkaappattanam (1985)
- "Romaancham Poothirangum"... Vellarikkaappattanam
- "Hemantha Kalam" ... Vellarikkaappattanam
