= Hayati Hamzaoğlu =

Turkish actor

- Born: 3 April 1933; Trabzon, Turkey
- Died: 16 April 2000 (aged 67); Antalya, Turkey
- Occupations: Actor, Director
- Years active: 1953–2000

Hayati Hamzaoğlu (3 April 1933 – 16 April 2000) was a Turkish actor.

== Biography ==
Hamzaoğlu was born in Trabzon. After leaving school, he began working in a number of different jobs such as a shoemaker and a goldsmith. He started his acting career in 1953 in a small part in Köy Çocuğu. In 1961, he first acted in a main role and gained fame later playing villainous characters.

He won the "Best supporting actor" award twice at the Antalya Golden Orange Film Festival for his roles in Bir Çirkin Adam and Tatar Ramazan. Additionally, he was awarded "Best supporting actor" at the 1969 Adana Golden Cocoon Festival for his performance in Kuyu. He died, aged 67, in Antalya.

== Filmography ==
- Tomurcuk – 1994
- Gönlüm Haktan Yana – 1994
- Tatar Ramazan Sürgünde – 1992
- Tatar Ramazan – 1990
- Oy Bebek – 1990
- Alev Gibi Bir Kız – 1990
- Leke – 1989
- Aşka Vakit Yok – 1988
- Canım – 1988
- Her şey Güzeldi – 1988
- Mayın – 1987
- Hacer Ana ve Oğulları – 1987
- Sultan – 1987
- Çakırcalı Mehmet Efe – 1987
- Efeler Diyarı – 1987
- Kan Çiçek Açtı – 1987
- Kuşatma 2 / Şok – 1987
- Yaralı Can – 1987
- Kuruluş / Osmancık – 1987
- Yaygara 86 – 1986
- Çoban Aşkı – 1986
- Kral Affetmez – 1986
- Oteldeki Cinayet – 1986
- Seni Sevmeyen Ölsün – 1986
- Veda Türküsü – 1986
- Veda – 1986
- Çalıkuşu – 1986
- Büyük Günah – 1985
- Eroin Hattı – 1985
- Sevgi Damlacıkları – 1985
- Geçim Otobüsü – 1984
- Damga – 1984
- Karanfilli Naciye – 1984
- Dertlerin Sahibi – 1984
- Gecelerin Adamı – 1984
- Dil Yarası – 1984
- Halk Düşmanı – 1984
- Sevdalandım – 1984
- Çocuklar Çiçektir – 1983
- Can Kurban – 1983
- Kahır – 1983
- Çelik Mezar – 1983
- İkimiz De Sevdik – 1983
- Kahreden Kurşun – 1983
- Ağlayan Gülmedi mi? – 1982
- Tomruk – 1982
- Kaçak – 1982
- Kader Bize Düşman mı? – 1982
- Sevenler Ölmez – 1982
- Gülsüm Ana – 1982
- Leyla İle Mecnun- 1982
- Sevdalım – 1981
- Takip – 1981
- Dört Kardeşe Dört Gelin – 1981
- Acı Gerçekler – 1981
- Yasak Aşk – 1981
- Ayrılık Kolay Değil – 1980
- Akrep Yuvası – 1977
- Tepedeki Ev – 1976
- Bitmeyen Şarkı – 1976
- Mağlup Edilemeyenler- 1976
- Kara Murat Kara Şövalyeye Karşı – 1975
- Ağrı Dağı Efsanesi – 1975
- En Büyük Patron – 1975
- Kıbrıs Fedaileri – 1975
- Kral Benim – 1975
- Her Yol Sana Helal – 1975
- Şafakta Buluşalım – 1975
- Ah Nerede – 1975
- Sahipsizler – 1974
- Öfkenin Bedeli – 1974
- Dadaş Rıfat – 1974
- Hamama Giren Terler – 1974
- İntikam – 1974
- Türk Aslanları – 1974
- Kızgın Toprak – 1973
- Yanaşma – 1973
- Bilal-i Habeşi – 1973
- Karateci Kız – 1973
- Çılgın Gangster – 1973
- Maceraya Bayılırım – 1973
- Vahşet – 1973
- Bu Toprağın Kızı – 1973
- Kara Osman – 1973
- Siyah Eldivenli Adam – 1973
- Malkoçoğlu Kurt Bey – 1972
- Aslanların Ölümü – 1972
- Süper Adam İstanbul'da – 1972
- Baskın – 1972
- Delioğlan – 1972
- Korkusuz Aşıklar – 1972
- Bitirim Kemal – 1972
- Cevriye'nin Kızları – 1972
- Çöl Kartalı – 1972
- Deli – 1972
- Hesabı Kim Ödeyecek – 1972
- Hesapta Bu Yoktu – 1972
- Kamalının İntikamı – 1972
- Kan Dökmez Remzi – 1972
- Sarı Öküz Parası – 1972
- Tövbekar – 1972
- Kardeş Kurşunu – 1972
- Çirkin Ve Cesur – 1971
- Vurguncular – 1971
- Rüzgar Murat – 1971
- Donkişot Sahte Şövalye – 1971
- Zapata – 1971
- Ağıt – 1971
- Avare Kalbim – 1971
- İki Yosmaya Bir Kurşun – 1971
- İntikam Saati – 1971
- İntikam Kartalları – 1971
- Kara Cellat – 1971
- Kara Memed – 1971
- Kerem İle Aslı – 1971
- Mezarını Kaz Beni Bekle – 1971
- Öldüren Yumruk – 1971
- Sevimli Hırsız – 1971
- Şahinler Diyarı – 1971
- Şeytana Uyduk Bir Kere – 1971
- Beş İdamlık Adam – 1971
- Umutsuzlar – 1971
- Keloğlan Aramızda – 1971
- Acı – 1971
- İmzam Kanla Yazılır – 1970
- Meçhul Kadın – 1970
- Kıskanırım Seni – 1970
- Kara Peçe – 1970
- Ham Meyva – 1970
- Dağların Kartalı – 1970
- Adım Kan Soyadım Silah – 1970
- Anadolu Kini – 1970
- Asi Ve Cesur – 1970
- Aşk Ve Tabanca – 1970
- Çarşambayı Sel Aldı – 1970
- Dönme Bana Sevgilim – 1970
- Dört Kabadayı – 1970
- Günahsız Katiller – 1970
- Yiğitlerin Dönüşü – 1970
- Öleceksek Ölelim – 1970
- Cesur Kabadayı – 1969
- Günah Bende mi? – 1969
- Bir Çirkin Adam – 1969
- Kanlı Şafak – 1969
- Kendi Düşen Ağlamaz – 1969
- Kanlı Aşk – 1969
- Ölüm Şart Oldu – 1969
- Sürgünler – 1969
- Yiğit Anadolu'dan Çıkar – 1969
- Çılgınlar Cehennemi – 1969
- Osman Efe – 1969
- İki Günahsız Kız – 1969
- Gül Ayşe – 1969
- Vatansızlar – 1969
- Yılın Kadını Değil – 1969
- Aç Kurtlar – 1969
- Toprağın Gelini – 1968
- Beyoğlu Canavarı – 1968
- Can Pazarı – 1968
- Seyyit Han – 1968
- Affedilmeyen Suç – 1968
- Beş Asi Adam – 1968
- Sinanoğlu'nun Dönüşü – 1968
- Kuyu – 1968
- Paydos – 1968
- Beşikteki Miras – 1968
- Köroğlu – 1968
- Ortaşark Yanıyor – 1967
- Şeytanın Oğlu – 1967
- Çelik Bilek – 1967
- Kurbanlık Katil – 1967
- Kanunsuz Toprak – 1967
- Türk Komandoları – 1967
- Killing Canilere Karşı – 1967
- Silahları Ellerinde Öldüler – 1967
- Bir Millet Uyanıyor – 1966 (Bigalı Deli Ömer)
- Bıçaklar Fora – 1966
- Silahlar Patlayınca – 1966
- Anadolu Kanunu – 1966
- Beyoğlu'nda Vuruşanlar – 1966
- Fedailer – 1966
- Mezarını Hazırla – 1966
- Gavur Dağın Eşkiyası – 1966
- Aşk Mücadelesi – 1966
- Dişi Kartal – 1966
- Haracıma Dokunma – 1965
- Murat'ın Türküsü – 1965
- Üçünüzü De Mıhlarım – 1965
- Yaralı Kartal – 1965
- Davudo – 1965
- Büyük Şehrin Kanunu – 1965
- Yalancı – 1965
- Hülya – 1965
- Akrep Kuyruğu – 1965
- Bitmeyen Kavga – 1965
- Yarına Boş Ver – 1965
- Ölüm Çemberi – 1965
- Şeytanın Kurbanları – 1965
- Sokaklar Yanıyor – 1965
- Silaha Yeminliydim – 1965
- Duvarların Ötesi – 1964
- İstanbul'un Kızları – 1964
- Kanun Karşısında – 1964
- Atçalı Kel Mehmet – 1964
- Keşanlı Ali Destanı – 1964
- Fatoş'un Fendi Tayfur'u Yendi – 1964
- Cehennem Arkadaşları – 1964
- Abidik Gubidik – 1964
- Harmandalı Efe'nin İntikamı – 1963
- Beş Kardeştiler – 1962
- Can Evimden Vurdular – 1962
- Kanun Kanundur – 1962
- Aramıza Kan Girdi – 1962
- Baharın Gülleri Açtı – 1961
- Ölüm Kayalıkları – 1961
- Kızıl Vazo – 1961
- Telli Kurşun – 1960
- Sonsuz Acı – 1960
- Gecelerin Ötesi – 1960
- Kara Sevdalı Yarim – 1959
- Dokuz Dağın Efesi – 1958
- Doksan Dokuz Mustafa – 1958
- Yayla Güzeli Gül Ayşe – 1956
- Köyün Çocuğu – 1953
