= Hiding and Seeking =

- Directed by: Menachem Daum; Oren Rudavsky
- Produced by: Menachem Daum; Oren Rudavsky
- Cinematography: Oren Rudavsky
- Edited by: Zelda Greenstein
- Music by: John Zorn
- Release date: 2004
- Running time: 97 minutes
- Country: United States
- Languages: English; Polish; Yiddish

Hiding and Seeking: Faith and Tolerance After the Holocaust is a 2004 American documentary film about Menachem Daum, an Orthodox Jew and son of Holocaust survivors who has spent his life interviewing survivors about the impact of the Holocaust on their lives. After hearing a disturbing tape of a rabbi preaching "hatred" of non-Jews, Daum attempts to raise an outcry in his Brooklyn Orthodox community. When ignored by the media and community leaders, Daum decides to fly to Israel to discuss the matter with his two sons, concerned with the "ethical legacy" he is responsible for leaving them.

Hiding and Seeking was produced, written, and directed by Menachem Daum and Oren Rudavsky and aired on PBS's Point of View series in 2005. It has been met with high critical praise, receiving a 90% rating on Rotten Tomatoes.
