= Süleyman Turan =

Turkish actor (1936–2019)

- Born: 19 November 1936; Istanbul, Turkey
- Died: 10 September 2019 (aged 82); Istanbul, Turkey
- Resting place: Karacaahmet Cemetery, Istanbul
- Occupations: Actor, painter
- Years active: 1963–2019

Süleyman Turan (19 November 1936 – 10 September 2019) was a Turkish film and theater actor.

Süleyman Turan died at the age of 82 in Istanbul on 10 September 2019. Following the religious funeral service held at Şakirin Mosque, he was interred at Karacaahmet Cemetery. He had a daughter, Beliz Turan.

== Selected filmography ==
Year	Title	Role	Notes
1971	Ayşecik ve Sihirli Cüceler Rüyalar Ülkesinde		
1972	Çöl Kartalı		
1972	Güllü	Faruk	
1984	The Ark of the Sun God		
2010	Yahşi Batı		

== Awards ==
- Golden Orange Award for Best Supporting Actor (1972)
- Golden Orange Life Achievement Award (2003)
