= Vladislav Gostishchev =

Russian actor (1940–2024)

- Владислав Гостищев
- Born: Vladislav Dmitrievich Gostishchev; 17 November 1940; Anapa, Krasnodar Krai, Russian SFSR, USSR
- Died: 18 August 2024 (aged 83); Kostroma, Russia
- Occupations: film and theatre actor
- Years active: 1975–2009

Vladislav Dmitrievich Gostishchev (Russian: Владислав Дмитриевич Гостищев; 17 November 1940 – 18 August 2024) was a Soviet and Russian film and theatre actor known for his work in Russian Cinema

== Life and career ==
Gostishchev graduated at the Krasnodar Academic Drama Theatre. After graduating, he worked at the Kostroma State Drama Theatre.

Gostishchev died in Kostroma on 18 August 2024, at the age of 83.

== Selected filmography ==
- 1975: The Boy and the Moose
- 1980: At the Beginning of Glorious Days as wagon driver
- 1984: A Cruel Romance as policeman
- 2009: Kotovski as Filkenstein
