= Ithu Manushyano =

- Directed by: Thomas Berly
- Written by: Thomas Berly
- Screenplay by: Thomas Berly
- Produced by: Thomas Berly
- Starring: Sheela; KPAC Lalitha; Adoor Bhasi; K. P. Ummer
- Cinematography: T. N. Krishnankutty Nair
- Music by: M. K. Arjunan
- Production company: Temple Arts
- Distributed by: Temple Arts
- Release date: 23 November 1973
- Country: India
- Language: Malayalam

Ithu Manushyano is a 1973 Indian Malayalam film, directed and produced by Thomas Berly. The film stars Sheela, KPAC Lalitha, Adoor Bhasi and K. P. Ummer in the lead roles. The film had musical score by M. K. Arjunan.

== Cast ==
- Sheela
- KPAC Lalitha
- Adoor Bhasi
- K. P. Ummer
- Sarojam
- Supriya (Fatafat Jayalaxmi)

== Soundtrack ==
The music was composed by M. K. Arjunan and the lyrics were written by Sreekumaran Thampi.

No.	Song	Singers	Lyrics	Length (m:ss)
1	"Hridayaveenathan"	K. J. Yesudas	Sreekumaran Thampi	
2	"Pakal Vilakkanayunnu"	P. Jayachandran	Sreekumaran Thampi	
3	"Paravakal Inapparavakal"	K. J. Yesudas	Sreekumaran Thampi	
4	"Sukhamoru Bindu"	K. J. Yesudas, B. Vasantha	Sreekumaran Thampi	
