= Coming Out (2013 film) =

Coming out
- Directed by: Dénes Orosz
- Starring: Sándor Csányi; Kátya Tompos
- Release date: 5 December 2013
- Running time: 1h 36min
- Country: Hungary
- Language: Hungarian

Coming out is a 2013 Hungarian comedy film directed by Dénes Orosz.

== Plot ==
"Coming Out" is the story of Erik (Sándor Csányi), a radio personality, gay activist, and Hungary's most famous openly gay male celebrity. As Erik is preparing to marry his partner Balázs (Gábor Karalyos), he is shocked to discover he has a growing sexual attraction to women.

After experiencing an injury during a motorcycle accident, Erik gradually discovers that he is attracted to women and falls in love with Linda, his physician. His new-found attraction to Linda causes Erik to doubt whether he should go ahead with his marriage to Balázs.

== Cast ==
- Sándor Csányi – Erik
- Kátya Tompos – Linda
- Gábor Karalyos – Balázs
- Anikó Für – Júlia
- József Gyabronka – Kálmán
- Klára Nényei – Fanni
- Zoltán Mucsi – Pecsák
- Katalin Takács – Mother
