= Oren Rudavsky =

American documentary filmmaker

Oren Rudavsky (born c. 1957) is an American documentary filmmaker known for exploring individuals and communities outside the mainstream. A 1979 graduate of Oberlin College, he is also a recipient of a Guggenheim Fellowship. He is currently producing the NEH-funded American Masters documentary Joseph Pulitzer: Voice of the People and working on a film for Witness Theater, a program that brings together high school students and Holocaust survivors, culminating in a dramatization of the survivors’ lives. His films Colliding Dreams, co-directed with Joseph Dorman, and The Ruins of Lifta, co-directed with Menachem Daum, were both released theatrically in 2016.

Rudavsky’s earlier work includes A Life Apart: Hasidism in America, which was shortlisted for the Academy Awards, and Hiding and Seeking, which received an Independent Spirit Award nomination; both films were co-directed with Menachem Daum. He also produced media for the permanent installations at the Russian Jewish Museum and Tolerance Center in Moscow, which opened in 2013. His projects for television include the 2011 Bloomberg series Risk Takers and the 2009 two-part PBS documentary Time for School 3, a twelve-year longitudinal study of children’s education in the developing world, for which he served as Producer/Writer. In 2006, he completed his first narrative feature, The Treatment, starring Chris Eigeman, Ian Holm, and Famke Janssen. The film premiered at the Tribeca Film Festival, where it won the Best Film, Made in New York award.

In addition to filmmaking, Rudavsky has written and produced segments for PrimeTime Live, Media Matters, Religion & Ethics Newsweekly, and other national programs. Earlier in his career, he worked as a post-production supervisor for the film unit of Saturday Night Live and the syndicated series Tales From the Darkside during the 1980s.

== Filmography ==
=== As director ===
- At the Crossroads: Jewish Life in Eastern Europe Today 1988
- Dreams So Real, an animated film about three mentally ill men who created their own films, won first prize at the New England Film Festival in 1981.
- A Film About My Home, an autobiographical film 1981
- Gloria: A Case Of Alleged Police Brutality. 1983
- Ritual, a documentary about Jewish ritual incorporating scholarly commentary with portraits of individuals 1990
- Saying Kaddish, which was nominated for an Emmy Award in Directing 1992
- Spark Among the Ashes: A Bar Mitzvah in Poland took second prize at the Chicago International Film Festival and a Blue Ribbon at the American Film Festival and was included in the Sundance Film Festival. 1986
- Theater of the Palms: The World of Puppet Master Lee Tien Lu 1989
- A Life Apart in collaboration with Menachem Daum was shortlisted for an Academy Award and was nominated for an emmy. PBS 1994
- Hiding and Seeking in collaboration with Menachem Daum PBS POV 1997
- The Treatment Best Film Made in New York, Tribeca Film Festival, 2006
- "''Time for School" 2003, 2006, Produced by Judy Katz 2009, in collaboration with Tamara Rosenberg PBS, 2016
- "To Educate a Girl" 2011 in collaboration with Fred Rendina
- "Michael Burry" 2012 Bloomberg TV
- "Michelle Rhee" 2012 Bloomberg TV
- "Colliding Dreams" aka "The Zionist Idea" 2016 in collaboration with Joseph Dorman
- "The Ruins of Lifta" in collaboration with Menachem Daum 2016
- "Joseph Pulitzer" 2018
- "Witness Theater" 2018
- "Elie Wiesel: Soul On Fire" 2024

As Producer

- "Todo parecía posible" 2025

=== As Director of Photography ===
- The Amish: Not to be Modern
- "Spark Among the Ashes"
- "Theater of the Palms"
- The Last Klezmer
- Twitch and Shout, a film about Tourette’s syndrome
- A Life Apart: Hasidism in America
- "Colliding Dreams"
- " Joseph Pulitzer: Voice of the People"
- "The Ruins of Lifta"
