= Güllü =

1972 Turkish comedy film

- Directed by: Atıf Yılmaz
- Starring: Türkan Şoray; Ediz Hun; Süleyman Turan; Hulusi Kentmen; Aynur Aydan
- Release date: February 1, 1972
- Running time: 1h 24min
- Country: Turkey
- Language: Turkish

Güllü is a 1972 Turkish romantic comedy film directed by Atıf Yılmaz.

== Cast ==
- Türkan Şoray - Güllü / Gül
- Ediz Hun - Fikret / Ahmet
- Süleyman Turan - Faruk
- Hulusi Kentmen - Naci
