= Çöl Kartalı =

- Theatrical poster
- Directed by: Halit Refiğ
- Written by: Halit Refiğ, Bülent Oran, Memduh Ün
- Produced by: Memduh Ün
- Starring: Cüneyt Arkın; Bahar Erdeniz; Süleyman Turan; Meral Zeren; Hayati Hamzaoğlu; Cemil Can Bıçakçı
- Production company: Uğur Film
- Release date: 1 October 1972
- Running time: 87 min
- Country: Turkey
- Language: Turkish

Çöl Kartalı is a 1972 Turkish historical romance film, directed by Halit Refiğ and starring Cüneyt Arkın, Bahar Erdeniz, Süleyman Turan.

== Plot ==
The film is about the love of two Ottoman officers, who are close friends, for the same woman. Murat and Faruk, who grew up together, are among the successful officers of the Ottoman Empire. Unaware of each other, they fall in love with Kamil Pasha's daughter, Leyla. While Murat and Leyla have been dreaming of marriage for a long time, Faruk is looking for a way to open up to Leyla. When Murat and Faruk graduate from military school, they are assigned to Yemen by Kamil Pasha. One day, when they are in conflict with the desert bandits, Murat is injured and lost in the desert. Faruk escapes and returns to Istanbul and asks Kamil Pasha for Leyla. Leyla accepts this marriage to forget her pain. Meanwhile, Murat is rescued by a slave who finds himself in the desert. When his wounds heal, he returns to Istanbul. The marriage of Leyla and Faruk will cause her to return to the deserts.

== Cast ==
- Cüneyt Arkın
- Bahar Erdeniz
- Süleyman Turan
- Hayati Hamzaoğlu
- Atıf Kaptan
- Kazım Kartal
- Cemil Can Biçakcı
- Yusuf Sezer
- Murat Tok
- Tuba Şarman
- Mehmet Şahiner
- Meral Zeren
