= K. C. Fox =

American set decorator (1954–2024)

- Born: February 1, 1954
- Died: August 28, 2024 (aged 70); Los Angeles, California, U.S.
- Occupation: Set decorator

Karen Cynthia Fox (February 1, 1954 – August 28, 2024) was an American set decorator known for her work on The Girl with the Dragon Tattoo, Speed, and Criminal Minds. She had a career spanning over four decades and was a founding member of the Set Decorators Society of America (SDSA). She died of pancreatic cancer in Los Angeles on August 28, 2024, at the age of 70.

At the 97th Academy Awards, her name was mentioned in the In Memoriam section.

== Filmography ==
Year	Film	Notes
1996	Multiplicity	
1997	Volcano	
1998	Dr. Dolittle	
2003	Legally Blonde 2: Red, White & Blonde	
2003	Cheaper by the Dozen	
2004	Fat Albert	
2005	The 40-Year-Old Virgin	
2008	Forgetting Sarah Marshall	
