= Banker Bilo =

1980 Turkish comedy film

- Movie poster
- Directed by: Ertem Eğilmez
- Written by: Sadik Sendil; Yavuz Turgul
- Produced by: Ertem Eğilmez
- Starring: Ilyas Salman; Meral Zeren; Sener Sen; Ahu Tugba; Münir Özkul
- Cinematography: Ertunç Senkay
- Distributed by: Arzu Films
- Release date: 1980
- Running time: 85 minutes
- Country: Turkey
- Language: Turkish

Banker Bilo is a 1980 Turkish-language comedy film directed and produced by Ertem Eğilmez. The film features Ilyas Salman, Meral Zeren, Sener Sen and Ahu Tugba in the lead role. The film was one of the most popular Turkish comedy films released in the 1980s.

== Plot ==
Bilo (Ilyas Salman) is an unemployed youth living in a small village in Turkey. With the promise to be brought to Munich, he and his best friend Ibrahim are scammed by Maho, Bilo's childhood friend. They are set off in Istanbul instead and after losing Ibo, Bilo is forced to make a living in the city, and he is faced by problems which brings comical elements in the film.

He starts as construction worker first and learns very soon about how everything works through bribery and tries different jobs such as travelling vegetable salesman and cigarette dealer. His naivety and unawareness brings him into trouble and he ends up being beaten. Soon he encounters Ibo again, who has become corrupted through the city, as he asks Bilo for money in exchange for accommodation in an illegally built house he doesn't even own.

During a working day, Bilo and Maho encounter and Maho offers Bilo to work together. The two enter into oil business, which is, in fact, part of the black market since oil is in shortage in the city. After a report to the police, presumably made by Maho, Bilo is arrested and sentenced to five years of prison since he is the sole official owner.

During these five years, Maho, who is known as Mahmut, greatly improves his business. He starts building a set of dwelling apartments, befriends a loanshark, marries his daughter, Necla, and becomes a banker himself. Although promised, he never visits Bilo at all, but owns a plastics production factory and several apartments in a row. After that time, Bilo is released and departs to find Ibo, who has become a full-time tobacco and spirituose dealer. He is offered a job, but Bilo turns it down. Furthermore, Bilo is surprised when he learns that Zeyno, Bilo's love interest, and her parents have moved to Istanbul.

After reuniting with Zeyno and her parents, Bilo is offered a job in a plastics factory by Zeyno's father. To Bilo's surprise, the factory owner is none other than Mahmut himself. Mahmut, who is well aware of Bilo's honesty, hires him as a janitor for one of his apartments instead. There, it is revealed that Zeyno is actually working as a maid for Mahmut and he, too, is interested in her despite being married. Zeyno only accepts Mahmut's advancements because he promised to divorce from his wife and marry her. Necla gets suspicious that her husband might be cheating on her while she is away, so Mahmut organizes a plot: He fakes an engagement between Bilo and Zeyno so Necla would think that there is actually nothing between them since she got engaged by her free will. Bilo, unaware of this plot, is overjoyed by this and thanks Mahmut for supporting this.

Mahmut gets an opportunity to take over a soft drink factory in Germany, but he is hesitant to sign the contract since he can't trust any of his power-hungry executives. Departing to another country would need a temporary director, who would be able to do anything with Mahmut's companies as long as he is abroad. A sudden twist of the events changes Mahmut's mind: Mahmut asks Bilo to use the janitor's apartment to meet his secret lover, to which Bilo agrees out of his friendship. As the other janitors warn him that the secret lover is none other than Zeyno, Bilo is enraged as he finds them together. Realizing that Bilo won't even turn against Mahmut even under such circumstances, he decides to give Bilo control over all his companies and departs to Germany, with the intention of getting rid of Bilo once and for all afterwards.

During this one week, Bilo uses this power to change the ownership of everything Maho is owning: His construction company, his plastic factory, his apartments, his office, his accounts, everything. Mahmut is thrown out of his own apartment and an entrance is denied to him. A brief confrontation with Bilo ends up bitterly for Mahmut. Bilo has successfully taken his revenge on Mahmut.

Immediately after that, Zeyno and her parents confront him with the hope that Bilo would forgive them. Bilo brushes them and reveals that he is engaged to Mahmut's ex-wife Necla and left his honest ways once and for all, explaining that he, as a banker and factory owner, has nothing to do with a simple maid and all the people around him have killed his old self together.

== Cast ==
- Ilyas Salman as Bilo
- Meral Zeren as Zeyno
- Sener Sen as Maho / Mahmut
- Ahu Tugba as Necla
- Münir Özkul as Hasan
- Ali Şen as Ali Aga
