= Michael Trcic =

American sculptor (1960–2024)

- Born: September 28, 1960; Pittsburgh, Pennsylvania, U.S.
- Died: January 30, 2024 (aged 63); Clarkdale, Arizona, U.S.
- Occupation: Sculptor
- Known for: Paleontological models of dinosaurs (paleoart); Work with Tyrannosaurus rex model in Jurassic Park

Michael Anthony Trcic (September 28, 1960 – January 30, 2024) was an American sculptor best known for his paleontological models of dinosaurs. He worked for many years as a special effects artist for films and television programs, and was one of the lead animators and puppeteers for the famous Tyrannosaurus rex model featured in Steven Spielberg's 1993 film Jurassic Park. He has also worked in television animation, including for Discovery Channel's 2002 documentary film When Dinosaurs Roamed America. For models and other artwork outside of special effects, Trcic commonly consulted with paleontologists in order to achieve a high standard of accuracy for his work. His sculpture has been compared to that of Brian Cooley, but with a "somewhat more traditional" style. He has provided dinosaur sculpture work for a variety of media and institutions, including IMAX, The University of Chicago, The National Geographic Society, Disney, and the Arizona Museum of Natural History, where his life-sized bronze Dilophosaurus sculpture is featured. His statue of the sauropod dinosaur Jobaria can be viewed at the Navy Pier of Chicago, Illinois. Trcic's work has also been published in a variety of written media, including Random House's book Hunting Dinosaurs and the magazines Earth Magazine and Prehistoric Times.

Outside of dinosaur-related work, Trcic also worked alongside the horror and sci-fi directors Steven Spielberg, Tim Burton, George A. Romero, Sam Raimi and James Cameron on Jurassic Park, Batman Returns, Dawn of the Dead, Evil Dead 2, and Terminator 2: Judgment Day, respectively.

== Personal life and death ==
Michael Anthony Trcic was born in Pittsburgh, Pennsylvania on September 28, 1960. He lived in Sedona, Arizona, where he created Fine Art Bronze in Wildlife and Western Figurative. Trcic died in Clarkdale, Arizona on January 30, 2024, at the age of 63.

== Awards and honors ==
Trcic's film work has received multiple awards and distinctions, including Oscars for both Terminator 2 and Jurassic Park. He was also the recipient of the Lanzendorf PaleoArt Prize in 3-dimensional art in both 2000 and 2001.
