= Menachem Daum =

Holocaust survivor and documentary filmmaker (1946–2024)

- Born: October 5, 1946; Landsberg am Lech, Bavaria, Germany
- Died: January 7, 2024 (aged 77); Brooklyn, New York, U.S.
- Education: Brooklyn College; Fordham University
- Occupation: Documentary filmmaker
- Spouse: Rifka Federman
- Children: 3

Menachem Daum (October 5, 1946 – January 7, 2024) was an American Orthodox Jewish documentary filmmaker.

== Background ==
Daum was born on October 5, 1946, in a displaced persons camp in Landsberg am Lech, Germany, to refugees from Poland who had survived the Holocaust. Being Jewish, many of his relatives perished in Nazi Germany's genocide. His parents, who met in the refugee camp, had both been married and had children before, but their spouses and children were killed in the Holocaust.

In 1951, the family settled in the United States, briefly in Schenectady, New York, before moving to Borough Park, Brooklyn, so Daum could be raised in a Jewish community and attend yeshivas. Daum later attended Brooklyn College and Fordham University, receiving a PhD from the latter. He became a gerontologist who worked for both the city of New York and Hunter College.

== Career ==
Daum made his first film, In Care of: Families and Their Elders, after he became a caregiver for his mother, who suffered from Alzheimer's disease. He then made A Life Apart (1997) on Hasidim in Brooklyn, and Hiding and Seeking (2003), a film on Polish gentiles that sheltered Jews during World War II. Through his efforts, he secured the Yad Vashem award for the family that sheltered his wife's family. He partnered on the films with Oren Rudavsky.

Hiding and Seeking, began as a search to reconnect with the Poles that sheltered his family. The Jewish Week wrote of Daum's work on this film, "The film speaks more deeply to how religious intolerance is insidious no matter who is practicing it, and upbraids Holocaust survivors who broke all ties with their rescuers, despite wartime promises to stay in touch forever".

"I believe in the importance of self-criticism for all communities, Jewish, non-Jewish Islamic, Christian", says Daum. "We do ourselves a disservice when we can see faults in others but not see our own shortcomings".

By 2008, he was working on a film, Common Ground, addressing the work of non-Jews in working to maintain Jewish cemeteries in Poland.

== Personal life and death ==
Daum and his wife, Rifka (née Federman), had three children and lived in Borough Park. He died from heart failure at a Brooklyn hospital on January 7, 2024, at the age of 77.
