= A Life Apart: Hasidism in America =

- Directed by: Menachem Daum; Oren Rudavsky
- Produced by: Menachem Daum; Oren Rudavsky
- Narrated by: Leonard Nimoy; Sarah Jessica Parker
- Cinematography: Oren Rudavsky
- Edited by: Ruth Schell
- Music by: Yale Strom
- Release date: 1997
- Running time: 96 minutes
- Country: United States
- Language: English

A Life Apart: Hasidism in America is 1997 American documentary film produced for PBS about Hasidic Judaism in America produced and directed by Menachem Daum and Oren Rudavsky, written by Daum and Robert Seidman, and narrated by Leonard Nimoy and Sarah Jessica Parker.

The film is the first documentary to cover the American Hasidic community in an in-depth manner, and mainly examines Hasidic sects in Brooklyn and focuses on the Hasidic way of life and the struggles and conflicts that face the movement's adherents.

== Overview ==
The film covers the lives of American Hasidic communities by tracing their roots in pre-War Europe, the near-extinction of their communities during the Holocaust, and the difficulties they faced when they began settling in America. The early Hasidic rabbis are shown to be wary of life in America as a place of necessary refuge. The Hasidic rabbis were concerned that liberalism and consumerism would lead to assimilation and began to place strict practices to preserve their culture from American secularism.

The cinematic focus of the film concentrates on the physical appearance of Hasidim, especially of the men's black attire and forelocks. The film also focuses on the rigorous avoidance of general culture including the public schools, sports and entertainment, and popular media. The Hasidic refusal to participate in general America's culture is seen as both a strength of traditional values or as a fault of an "elitist attitude" and archaic sexism of gender roles and arranged marriages.

=== Interviews ===
Interviews include Yaffa Eliach, Samuel Heilman, Arthur Hertzberg and Mayer Schiller. Chabad rabbi Berel Lazar and his family are featured in the film.

=== Cantor ===
Cantorial renditions were contributed by hazzan David Werdyger.

== See also ==
- Ha-Chatzer (2003 TV series)
- Shtisel (2013 TV series)
- Unorthodox (2020 Netflix miniseries)
