= Jean E. Karl =

American novelist

- Born: Jean Edna Karl; July 29, 1927; Chicago, Illinois, US
- Died: March 30, 2000 (aged 72); Lancaster, Pennsylvania, US
- Education: Mount Union College (BA)
- Occupations: Editor, author
- Writing career
- Period: 1949–c. 1999
- Genres: Children's literature, science fiction
- Notable works: From Childhood to Childhood: Children's Books and Their Creators

Jean Edna Karl (July 29, 1927 in Chicago, Illinois – March 30, 2000 in Lancaster, Pennsylvania) was an American book editor who specialized in children's and science fiction titles. She founded and led the children's division and young adult and science fiction imprints at Atheneum Books, where she oversaw or edited books that won two Caldecott Medals and five Newbery Medals. One of the Newberys went to the new writer E. L. Konigsburg in 1968 for From the Mixed-Up Files of Mrs. Basil E. Frankweiler.

== Life ==
Karl was born and raised in Chicago. She graduated from the Methodist Church-affiliated Mount Union College in 1949 and immediately began work in the book industry, initially at Scott Foresman in Chicago (Dick and Jane readers), then at the Methodist Church-owned Abingdon Press in New York City (children's editor). The founder of Atheneum, Alfred A. Knopf, Jr. personally recruited her in 1961 to establish the Atheneum Books for Young Readers division which she led until she retired. There she started the imprints Aladdin Paperbacks (mass market children's) and Atheneum Argo (young-adult science fiction [hardcover]). Atheneum is now part of Simon & Schuster. (Note: During Karl's tenure on the staff, Atheneum merged with Charles Scribner's Sons in 1978 and Macmillan US acquired the resulting Scribner Book Company in 1984. Later, Robert Maxwell in 1989 and Simon & Schuster in 1994 acquired Macmillan. (See Robert Maxwell.))

After retiring in 1985 she continued to edit books (as Atheneum editor-at-large) almost until her death in 2000. She died at a hospice in Lancaster with no immediate survivors.

She was long active in the Children's Book Council for which she served as president, and in the Association of American Publishers.

== Author ==
Karl wrote science fiction for children and young adults: a collection The Turning Place (E. P. Dutton, 1976) and novels Beloved Benjamin is Waiting (Dutton, 1978), But We are Not of Earth (Dutton, 1981), and Strange Tomorrow (Dutton, 1985). Her science fiction was originally submitted under her grandmother's maiden name R. W. Munson.

She wrote two important books about children's books: From Childhood to Childhood: Children’s Books and Their Creators (John Day, 1970) and How to Write and Sell Children's Picture Books (Writer's Digest Books, 1994). Vicki Palmquist at Children's Literature Network credits the former with a "satisfying look into how publishing decisions are made".

== Editor ==
E. L. Konigsburg was a suburban mother of three schoolchildren without previous publications when she submitted two manuscripts in 1966; Karl accepted both. Jennifer, Hecate, Macbeth, William McKinley, and Me, Elizabeth was published first, then Mixed-Up Files. They won the Newbery Honor (in 1971, retroactive) and the Newbery Medal, still the only Newbery recognitions for two books by one author in one year. Konigsburg has called Karl her "forever editor" and "stalwart editor". Without mentioning a name, she explained the editorial process to Scholastic Teacher (no date):

How do you go about revising your writing?
My editor – I've had the same editor always – sends me some suggestions. I have had two books go directly from manuscript to typescript, which is like getting an A+ on a paper. My editor makes suggestions, and I read them all and work with them. Neither she nor I approves of someone going in to tweak the story. We agree that you should read the comments over the whole story, and then decide what you are going to churn up. You don't change little bits at a time.

Ursula K. Le Guin had published the first Earthsea book with the California small press Parnassus in 1968. The second, third, and fourth books were published by Atheneum in 1971, 1972, and 1990. The Tombs of Atuan (1971) earned a Newbery Honor and The Farthest Shore (1972) a National Book Award in category young people's literature. Ms. Le Guin lists five other books published by Atheneum, 1976 to 1992 "(major books only, principal US editions only)".

Anne McCaffrey had published two Dragonriders of Pern books with Ballantine in 1968 and 1971, and had a contract for one more. Karl hoped to attract more female readers to science fiction by providing the right characters. Around 1974 she solicited "a story for young women in a different part of Pern". McCaffrey worked up a languishing false start as Dragonsong and they contracted for a sequel before it was out in 1976. Dragonsinger and Dragondrums followed in 1977 and 1979. (Note: Atheneum published these three books which Doubleday christened The Harper Hall of Pern for its 1984 omnibus edition. Otherwise Ballantine has continued to publish the Pern books. Harper Hall - series bibliography. ISFDB. Retrieved 2011-10-21.)

Beginning in 1973, Karl edited five Patricia A. McKillip books including the author's first novel in 1974 The Forgotten Beasts of Eld after it was rejected by an adult publisher. It won the first World Fantasy Award for Best Novel.

The third one was The Forgotten Beasts of Eld which won the World Fantasy Award. That I wrote as an adult novel, but after it got rejected by the adult department at Atheneum, my children's editor, Jean Karl, took it. She wanted cross-over novels for teen-aged girls, which was kind of rare in those days.

== Awards ==
Karl oversaw or edited books that won two Caldecott Medals, five Newbery Medals, five Newbery Honors (honorable mentions), one National Book Award, and one World Fantasy Award. Others won eight Edgar Allan Poe Awards.

Caldecott Medal

- Beatrice Schenk de Regniers, May I Bring a Friend?, illustrated by Beni Montresor
- Gail E. Haley, A Story a Story

Newbery Medal

- E. L. Konigsburg, From the Mixed-Up Files of Mrs. Basil E. Frankweiler
- Robert C. O'Brien, Mrs. Frisby and the Rats of NIMH
- Phyllis Reynolds Naylor, Shiloh
- Cynthia Voigt, Dicey's Song
- Maia Wojciechowska, Shadow of a Bull

National Book Award

- Ursula K. Le Guin, The Farthest Shore

World Fantasy Award

- Patricia A. McKillip, The Forgotten Beasts of Eld

Edgar Allan Poe Award

- eight(?) (Note: The Edgars Database reports 12 award winners with publisher/producer name = Atheneum, 1976 to 1998. The four earliest were 1976 to 1985 in the "Best Juvenile" category. Eight more were published by Atheneum while Karl was editor-at-large in retirement, include five in the Best Juvenile category and one Best Young Adult (category established 1989).)

All these are annual awards. The Edgars recognize mystery in several categories including mystery fiction with subcategories such as short story and juvenile. The Caldecott recognizes one American children's picture book. The Newbery Medal recognizes one contribution to American children's literature, with the Newbery Honor for one or a few more distinguished nominees. The National Book Awards recognize books in four categories including young people's literature (the award to Le Guin).
