= The Outcasts of 19 Schuyler Place =

2004 novel by E. L. Konigsburg

- Front cover, hardcover edition
- Author: E. L. Konigsburg
- Language: English
- Genre: Young adult novel
- Publisher: Atheneum Books
- Publication date: 2004
- Publication place: United States
- Media type: Print (hardcover)
- Pages: 296 pp
- ISBN: 0-689-86636-4
- OCLC: 52478648
- LC Class: PZ7.K8352 Ou 2004

The Outcasts of 19 Schuyler Place (2004) is a young adult novel by E. L. Konigsburg. It is a companion of Silent to the Bone, a kind of prequel published four years later. Parent publisher Simon & Schuster recommends it for "Ages 10 up".

== Setting ==
The Outcasts is set in 19 Schuyler Place in the summer of 1983, primarily in downtown Epiphany, Clarion County, a fictional county in Greater New York.

One other Konigsburg novel is set primarily in Old Town and the neighboring Clarion State University community, Silent to the Bone (2000); so is some backstory in The Mysterious Edge of the Heroic World (2007). The View From Saturday is set in another middle-school district of Epiphany. (Note: Mrs. Olinski and her students go to Epiphany Middle School (The View From Saturday). The local middle school in Old Town is Knightsbridge, where Connor and Branwell take the city bus from Tower Hill on the other side of the university campus (Silent to the Bone).)

== Summary ==
Margaret lives the rest of vacation with the Uncles. For 45 years they have constructed three towers of scrap metal, glass, and ceramic. These are in their small back yard at 19 Schuyler Place, former Tappan Glass Works company housing sold to workers or immigrants such as the Roses. The uncles have remained through Old Town's decline and recent gentrification, but the new home owning gentry have petitioned to have the towers demolished. Margaret spurs and leads a belated fight to save them after the Uncles have lost their last battle and given up hope.

She plots initially with young Jake Kaplan. She personally recruits to the Cultural Preservation Committee. She does this through their mothers who still live in Epiphany, two adults who were friends of her own mother and neighbors of the towers as children, art museum director Peter Vanderwaal and Infinitel (a telephone company) attorney Loretta Bevilaqua. With Jake she must handle Phase One: Stop the demolition. On Loretta's advice she buys the towers for a dollar; on her own, she occupies them. Finally Jake must drag his mother and the Meadowlarks from Camp Talequa into the fray.

Phases Two and Three and the epilogue comprise fewer than 20 pages. Occupation with mass media publicity bought time. Peter who knew the towers as masterpieces of outsider art mustered academic opinions in support. Loretta, who recognized their potential function, persuaded Infinitel to buy them. They were moved to a new hilltop park above campus and topped with cellular phone antennas. Margaret's triumph was bittersweet: she anticipated sharing it with her returning parents but saw that their love had ended and her family would soon break up. Tower Hill became a suburban housing development.

== Characters ==
Margaret Rose Kane, 12, daughter of University Registrar Kane and Naomi Landau, a professor in the psychology department. She was named for her recently deceased grandmother Margaret Rose (Landau). Primarily she lives with her parents but they are away on vacation —until the denouement, page 285 of 296 in the Aladdin Paperbacks edition. They have always taken her along on previous vacations.

(Margaret was fifteen years older, four years earlier, as one of three main characters in Silent to the Bone (2000).)

Alex and Morris Rose are Margaret's great uncles; her namesake was their beloved older sister. The three siblings immigrated from Hungary during the 1930s or earlier, and purchased 19 Schuyler Place (company housing) from the glass works when it moved out of the city. They operated "Jewels Bi-Rose" when downtown business was good, dealing in crystal, ceramic, jewelry, and timepieces. Morris is an expert at timepiece repair, which has dwindled, and the brothers have been reduced to a small booth selling digital watches at the mall.

Mrs. Kaplan (Tillie), the regimentarian proprietor of Camp Talequa.

Jake Kaplan, son of Mrs. Kaplan and recently handyman at her Camp Talequa. He is an artist by avocation and a formerly a billboard painter.

Peter Vanderwaal is about the same age as Margaret's mother Naomi. He grew up next door at 21 Schuyler Place and the towers inspired his career. He directs the art center in Sheboygan, Wisconsin.

Loretta Bevilaqua, Peter Vanderwaal, and Naomi Landau were all born soon after World War II. She grew up at 17 Schuyler Place. She is an attorney and an executive at the New York City headquarters of mobile telephone company Infinitel.

(Margaret's grown-up allies Jake, Peter, and Loretta are secondary characters in The Mysterious Edge of the Heroic World (2007). Jake the artist is the absent father of boy narrator Amedeo Kaplan, and one cause or source of the boy's great knowledge of fine art. Deo lives with his mother Loretta and Peter is again a crucial helper.)
