= The Mysterious Edge of the Heroic World =

Novel by E. L. Konigsburg

- Author: E. L. Konigsburg
- Cover artist: Russell Gordon, design
- Language: English
- Genre: Children's novel, mystery
- Publisher: Atheneum Books
- Publication date: 2007
- Publication place: United States
- Media type: Print (hardcover & paperback)
- Pages: 244 pp (first, hard)
- ISBN: 1-4169-4972-0 (first edition, hard)

The Mysterious Edge of the Heroic World (2007) is a middle-age or young-adult novel by E.L. Konigsburg. It is somewhat a detective story, and some reviews present it as mystery fiction.

Amedeo Kaplan is both new boy and a rich boy in the sixth grade. He longs to discover something "no one" yet knows. He volunteers to help liquidate the portable property of an elderly woman who once sang opera in Europe and finds himself learning more about degenerate art and the German occupation of the Netherlands.

The Mysterious Edge is a kind of sequel to The Outcasts of 19 Schuyler Place (2004). Margaret Kane's two executive allies in The Outcasts are Amedeo Kaplan's godfather and mother here, about fifteen years later, and Vanderwaal family history is one aspect of The Mysterious Edge.

== Setting ==
Mysterious Edge is set in the present and primarily in the private residential part of St. Malo, Florida, a fictional navy town. One secondary setting is the art center in Sheboygan, Wisconsin, directed by Peter Vanderwaal. Backstory events occurred in Amsterdam, Vienna, and Epiphany, New York —the fictional city in Greater New York where the Bevilacquas, Roses, and Vanderwaals all lived at 17 to 21 Schuyler Place for a decade or two after World War II.

The Outcasts of 19 Schuyler Place (2004) itself provides some backstory for The Mysterious Edge. Epiphany, New York is the primary setting for two other novels, The View from Saturday and Silent to the Bone.

== Summary ==
Amedeo Kaplan and his divorced mother Loretta Bevilacqua have moved from Epiphany, New York to St. Malo, Florida. He is a new boy at school for the first time and does not yet have friends. He is happy to befriend the next-door neighbor Mrs. Zender, an opera singer on the European circuit in the fifties, who retired with a European husband to her childhood mansion in St. Malo. Mrs. Zender plans to move to the retirement community Waldorf Court while she can still afford it. Amedeo volunteers to help liquidate most of her possessions.

From his artist father Jake Kaplan, who lives back north, and many visits to the fine arts institutions of New York City, Amedeo is a novice expert on paintings and drawings. Working with classmate William Wilcox and his single mother, the professional appraiser and estate liquidator Mrs. Zender has engaged, he learns more about the business, about people, and about Mrs. Zender, who is in and out of every room they work.

Amedeo's godfather Peter Vanderwaal, who directs an art center, is preparing to host a traveling exhibition of Degenerate Art, a selection from the 1937 exhibition Entartete Kunst in Munich, the heart of Nazi Germany. Meanwhile, Peter's father John has died in Epiphany and his mother Mrs. Vanderwaal has pressed upon him a box that contains his father's life story. Amedeo finds on a Zender bookshelf a small drawing signed by the modern artist Modigliani. From Peter, he learns that Modigliani died young (in 1920); his paintings and drawings were commonly forged in post-war Europe.

Amedeo finally recalls that the drawing is familiar because he has seen it many times, within a family photo displayed at the Vanderwaal home. On the other hand, Amedeo and William come to suspect that Mrs. Zender planted the drawing for him to find. Peter never looked closely at John Vanderwaal's box before his mother repossessed it at the exhibition, but Mrs. Vanderwaal follows up a phone conversation with her son by driving her Winnebago to St. Malo and delivering the "life" directly to Amedeo and William.

With John Vanderwaal in hand and Mrs. Zender at hand, Amedeo and William pursue the mystery.

== Reception ==
Angela Leeper of Book Page reviewed the book, saying, "Each interlocking piece of this mystery produces an astounding puzzle that shows the importance of art, history, family, and friendship. For middle-grade readers and younger teens, The Mysterious Edge of the Heroic World is a true find!"

Matt Berman of Common Sense Media said, "This is clearly not for everyone, or even for most. Konigsburg not only writes about gifted children, she expects her experienced readers to be equally clever, to be comfortable with ambiguity and sophisticated vocabulary (or at least willing to look things up), and to be willing not only to read, but to think."

Mark David Bradshaw of Watermark Books reviewed the book, saying, "The interplay between these characters is subtle and absorbing, and Konigsburg does a masterly job of showing us that the biggest truths can’t just be dug up or dusted off—they can only be discovered by attempting to understand the crazy and amazing hearts of the people around us."
