= Century Village, Florida =

- unincorporated place
- Interactive map of Century Village, Florida
- Coordinates: 26°42′56″N 80°7′34″W
- Country: United States
- State: Florida
- County: Palm Beach

Area
  - Total: 1.1 sq mi (2.8 km^{2})
  - Land: 1.0 sq mi (2.6 km^{2})
  - Water: 0.077 sq mi (0.2 km^{2})
- Elevation: 16 ft (5 m)

Population (2000)
  - Total: 7,616
  - Density: 7,588/sq mi (2,929.8/km^{2})
- Time zone: UTC-5 (Eastern (EST))
  - Summer (DST): UTC-4 (EDT)
- Area codes: 561, 728
- FIPS code: 12-11437
- GNIS feature ID: 1867125

There are four "Century Villages" in South Florida's Miami metropolitan area, built by the same developer: West Palm Beach (Palm Beach County), Boca Raton (Palm Beach County), Deerfield Beach (Broward County), and Pembroke Pines (Broward County). This article deals only with the West Palm Beach Century Village, the only one formerly designated as a census-designated place. All of them are gated retirement communities, whose residents must be 55 or over.

== Demographics ==
As of the census of 2000, there were 7,616 people, 7,854 households, and 1,777 families residing in the CDP. The population density was 2,940.6 people/km^{2} (7,616 people/mi^{2}). There were 7,854 housing units at an average density of 3,379.9 units/km^{2} (8,754 units/mi^{2}). The racial makeup of the CDP was 98.41% White (95.6% were Non-Hispanic White), 0.43% African American, 0.03% Native American, 0.42% Asian, 0.08% Pacific Islander, 0.11% from other races, and 0.53% from two or more races. Hispanic or Latino of any race were 2.99% of the population.

In 2000, there were 7,854 households, out of which 0.1% had children under the age of 18 living with them, 29.0% were married couples living together, 2.4% had a female householder with no husband present, and 67.9% were non-families. 65.2% of all households were made up of individuals, and 57.4% had someone living alone who was 65 years of age or older. The average household size was 1.38 and the average family size was 2.07.

In 2000, in the former CDP, the population was spread out, with 0.3% under the age of 18, 0.3% from 18 to 24, 1.9% from 25 to 44, 12.9% from 45 to 64, and 84.6% who were 65 years of age or older. The median age was 78 years. For every 100 females, there were 61.1 males. For every 100 females age 18 and over, there were 61.0 males.

In 2000, the median income for a household in the CDP was $18,780, and the median income for a family was $29,604. Males had a median income of $22,557 versus $22,292 for females. The per capita income for the CDP was $18,920. About 7.2% of families and 12.3% of the population were below the poverty line, including none of those under age 18 and 11.6% of those age 65 or over.

As of 2000, English was the first language for 86.46% of all residents, while Yiddish accounted for 3.77%, Spanish for 3.43%, German was spoken by 1.75%, French made up 1.27%, Russian was totaled at 1.07%, Hebrew totaled 0.74%, Italian was at 0.67%, Polish at 0.47%, and Hungarian was the mother tongue 0.33% of the population.

== Century Village in popular culture ==
- Comedian Red Buttons was a frequent advertising spokesman for Century Village.
- Century Village is sometimes jokingly referred to as "Cemetery Village" due to the high proportion of elderly residents.
- Century Village provided subject matter for a comedy skit on the Phil Hendrie Show on the radio station 610 WIOD.
- The 1996 children's novel The View from Saturday by E. L. Konigsburg is partly set in Century Village.
