= Up from Jericho Tel =

Novel by E. L. Konigsburg

First edition

Up from Jericho Tel is a children's novel written and illustrated by E. L. Konigsburg, published by Atheneum Books in 1986.

It is Konigsburg's only speculative fiction novel, as catalogued by the Internet Speculative Fiction Database.

Its Library of Congress Subject Headings are Actors and actresses fiction; Supernatural fiction; Mystery and detective stories.

Publisher Simon & Schuster recommends it for readers age 10 to 14.

It has been assigned reading level 6.1.

== Plot summary ==
The book is about an eleven-year-old girl, Jeanmarie Troxell, and a boy, Malcolm Soo, who bury dead animals in a "graveyard" they make out of an abandoned place with many trees behind their trailer park. One day they find a dog who they think deserves a very special plot in the "cemetery", so they find the exact center of the yard and start digging, but they suddenly fall down into a hole that leads to a dead woman, former movie star Tallulah, and her dog (the dead dog they found on the street). She sends them on missions for special people and things, especially her lost necklace, the Regina Stone, but always for a pack of cigarettes. On their way, they find more than just objects. They find the meaning of friendship and what it takes to be a star.

== Industry recommendations ==
- Booklist Editors' Choice
- Notable Children's Trade Book Language (AR)

Kirkus Reviews gave Up from Jericho Tel a starred review.
