= Always Room for One More =

1965 picture book by Sorche Nic Leodhas

- Front cover, designed by N. Hogrogian, with Caldecott Medal Award
- Author: Sorche Nic Leodhas
- Illustrator: Nonny Hogrogian
- Genre: Children's book
- Publisher: Holt, Rinehart and Winston an imprint of Macmillian
- Publication date: 1965
- Publication place: United States
- Media type: Hardcover
- ISBN: 0-8050-0330-4
- OCLC: 24889407

Always Room for One More is a children's picture book written by Sorche Nic Leodhas with illustrations by Nonny Hogrogian. Published by Henry Holt and Company, it won the Caldecott Medal for excellence in American children's literature illustration in 1966. It tells the tale of Lachie MacLachlan, a generous Scottish man, who always welcomes in any weary traveler who walks by his home on a stormy night. The book is based on an old Scottish folk song the author heard from her grandfather as a child.

== Summary ==
Kindhearted Scotland native Lachie MacLachlan lives in a small cottage with his wife and ten children. Whenever a traveler passes by during a storm, Lachie, despite the small space of his home, allows them to stay. Soon, the home is filled with a vast number of travelers, but the house is unable to handle so many guests and falls apart. Afterwards, the guests build an even larger house for Lachie and his family, and the tale ends with Lachie continuing to welcome travelers into his home.

Awards
Preceded by May I Bring a Friend?	Caldecott Medal recipient 1966	Succeeded by Sam, Bangs and Moonshine
