= Gail E. Haley =

American children's writer and illustrator (born 1939)

Gail E. Haley (born November 4, 1939) is an American writer and illustrator. She has won the annual awards for children's book illustration from both the American and British librarians, for two different picture books. (Note: Haley is the only illustrator to win both awards, which date from 1938 and 1955 with rules that have usually made that unlikely or impossible for one person. From sometime around year 2000, the British Greenaway Medal is open to all illustrators of books published in the U.K. either originally or within three months, which covers co-publication and other arrangements that have become more and more common. The American Caldecott Medal remains restricted to U.S. citizens and residents.) She won the 1971 Caldecott Medal for A Story a Story (Atheneum Books, 1970), which she retold from an African folktale, and the 1976 Kate Greenaway Medal for The Post Office Cat, her own historical fiction about a London post office.

== Biography ==
Haley was born Gail Einhart in Charlotte, North Carolina. At The Charlotte Observer where her father was art director, she later recalled, "In the art department and pressrooms I soaked up the exciting smells and sounds of the graphic arts. I've had printer's ink and rubber cement in my veins ever since." She studied at Richmond Professional Institute and the University of Virginia (graphics and painting).

She married mathematician Joseph A. Haley in 1959. Her debut book both as writer and as illustrator was My Kingdom for a Dragon, published in 1962 by Crozet Print Shop of Crozet, Virginia. It was printed from wood and linoleum blocks in a limited edition of 1000 that she helped bind and sell. After a divorce she lived with Arnold Arnold as of 1965. They had two children, Marguerite and Geoffrey. The family lived in England from 1973 to 1980. The Post Office Cat, which is set in a British post office, was published in 1976 both by Scribner in America and The Bodley Head in Britain. She was eligible to win the British Greenaway Medal as a resident.

She is also the recipient of the Kadai.Tosho Awards, issued for best picture book of the year in Japan, and the 1980 Parents Choice Award.

There are at least two Gail E. Haley archives ("Papers").

As of 1999, Haley and her husband David Considine were Media Literacy consultants and co-authors.

For at least three decades Haley has "presented workshops, storytelling, art demonstrations and puppetry programs in schools and libraries throughout the USA, Canada, England and Australia."

== Selected works ==
=== Novels ===
- Madwomen of Meriweather (Still in galley form searching for a publisher, 2015; written and illustrated by Gail E. Haley - Inspiration from the story comes from the records of a North Carolina insane asylum in the 1920s.

=== Fiction ===
- : My kingdom for a dragon (Crozet Print Shop, 1962); written and illus. by Haley
- : One, two, buckle my shoe (Doubleday, 1964); traditional, illus. by Haley
- : A story, a story (Atheneum, 1970, PZ8.1.H139 St); an African tale, retold and illus. by Haley
- : Altogether, one at a time (Atheneum, 1971); by E. L. Konigsburg, illus. by Haley and others
- : The post office cat (Scribner, c1976, ISBN 0684146533); written and illus. by Haley
- : The green man (c1979; 1st American ed. Scribner, 1980, ISBN 0684163381); written and illus. by Haley —based on English legends of the Green Man
- : Mountain Jack tales (Dutton, c1992, ISBN 0525449744); as told and illus. by Haley —"These stories featuring the hero Jack are set in the mountains of North Carolina, but have their roots in Old World folklore. The illustrations are wood engravings." (LCC summary)
- Isabella Propeller and the Magic Beanie (Parkway Publishing, c2011, ISBN 9781933251745); written by Jonathan Graves and illustrated by Gail E. Haley

=== Nonfiction ===
Professional education

- : Visual Messages: Integrating imagery into instruction, David M. Considine and Gail E. Haley, Englewood, Colo. : Teacher Ideas Press, 1992, ISBN 0872879127
- : Imagine That: Developing critical thinking and critical viewing through children’s literature, David M. Considine, Gail E. Haley, Lyn Ellen Lacy, Englewood, Colo. : Teacher Ideas Press, 1994, ISBN 1563081458

Juvenile

- LCC record: Costumes for plays and playing (Methuen, 1978, ISBN 0458935204) —"A guide to making costumes for plays, Halloween, parties, or make-believe with instructions for many types of accessories, ideas for finding and remaking old clothes, and tips on getting into character." (LCC summary)

Film

- "Printmaking techniques in book illustration". Filmstrip, sound cassette, and guide. Weston Woods Studios. 1977(?).
- "Wood and linoleum illustration". 17-minute filmstrip, sound cassette, and guide. Weston Woods Studios. 1978.
