= From the Mixed-Up Files of Mrs. Basil E. Frankweiler =

1967 novel by E. L. Konigsburg

- First edition
- Author: E. L. Konigsburg
- Illustrator: Konigsburg
- Cover artist: Konigsburg (first)
- Language: English
- Genre: Children's literature, mystery
- Publisher: Atheneum Publishers
- Publication date: 1967
- Publication place: United States
- Media type: Print (hardcover, paperback), audio book
- Pages: 162 (first edition)
- ISBN: 0-689-20586-4
- OCLC: 440951825
- LC Class: PZ7.K8352 Fr

From the Mixed-Up Files of Mrs. Basil E. Frankweiler is a children's novel by E. L. Konigsburg. The book follows siblings Claudia and Jamie Kincaid as they run away from home to the Metropolitan Museum of Art in New York City. It was published by Atheneum in 1967, the second book published from two manuscripts the new writer had submitted to editor Jean E. Karl.

From the Mixed-Up Files won the annual Newbery Medal for excellence in American children's literature in 1968.

== Summary ==
The prologue is a letter from Mrs. Basil E. Frankweiler, addressed "To my lawyer, Saxonberg", accompanied by a drawing of her writing at her office desk. It serves as the cover letter for the 162-page narrative, and provides background for changes to her last will and testament.

Eleven-year-old Claudia Kincaid decides to run away from her home in Greenwich, Connecticut, because she thinks that her parents do not appreciate her. She takes refuge in the Metropolitan Museum of Art (the Met) in New York City with her brother Jamie. She chooses Jamie as her companion partly because he has saved all his money. With the help of an unused adult train fare card that she found in a wastebasket, Claudia finds a way to get to the museum for free using the commuter train and a very long walk.

Early chapters depict Claudia and Jamie settling in at the Met: hiding in the restroom at closing time, as security staff check to see that all the patrons have departed; blending in with school groups on tour; bathing in the fountain; using "wishing coins" for money; and sleeping in Irwin Untermyer's antique bed.

A new exhibit draws sensational crowds and fascinates the children: the marble statue of an angel, the sculptor unknown but suspected to be Michelangelo. It was purchased at auction, for only a few hundred dollars, from Mrs. Basil E. Frankweiler, a collector who recently closed her showcase Manhattan residence. The children research it on site and at the Donnell Library, and give their conclusion to the museum staff anonymously.

After learning that they have been naïve, the children spend the last of their money on travel to Mrs. Frankweiler's home in Connecticut. She recognizes them as runaways but sets them briefly to the task of researching the angel from files in her long bank of cabinets. Despite the idiosyncratic organization of her files, the children discover the angel's secret—Mrs. Frankweiler has purposefully "given away" a virtually priceless Michelangelo to the Met. In exchange for a full account of their adventure, she will leave the crucial file to them in her will if they keep it secret during her lifetime, and send them home in her Rolls-Royce.

Claudia learns her deep motive for persisting in the crazy search: she wanted a secret of her own to treasure and keep. Mrs. Frankweiler may get "grandchildren" who delight her. Her lawyer (who is revealed to be the children's maternal grandfather) gets a luncheon date at the Met, to revise her will.

== Characters ==
The Kincaids live in Greenwich. Mrs. Frankweiler lives on a "country estate" in Farmington, Connecticut.

- Claudia Kincaid, 11, is the oldest of four children and the only girl, so she both sets the table and empties the dishwasher. She is a straight-A sixth grade student, a critic of English grammar, and a good planner, except about money, which she spends largely on sweets. She feels unappreciated at home, plans to run away with her brother Jamie, and recruits him. They run to the Metropolitan Museum and there discover a mystery of the art world, which fascinates her and overwhelms the adventure.
- James "Jamie" Kincaid, 9, is the third child and the middle boy, in fourth grade, quiet and frugal. He complements his sister perfectly: "adventurous (about everything but money) and rich" —from their viewpoint, an American suburb in the mid‑1960s. He cheats at the card game War, playing with his best friend for money on the school bus daily, having a gross tradition for not shuffling their cards. He often bothers his sister about money along their journey. From that and his weekly allowance he has saved $24.43 (equal to about $230 in 2024), and he has a transistor radio, his one purchase. Jamie was recruited treasurer of the team because of the way he spends his money carefully.
- Mrs. Basil E. Frankweiler, 82, is smart, insightful, eccentric, and rich. She is the narrator, telling the story of Claudia and Jamie Kincaid to her attorney. She is a commentator, providing insight into the children's actions. She is the plot facilitator, for her election to allow sale of an extraordinary sculpture at auction, for only $225, set the book's mystery in motion.
- Saxonberg is Mrs. Frankweiler's lawyer, and is revealed to be Claudia and Jamie's grandfather as a huge surprise in the end of the book, and Claudia and Jamie have yet to find out.

== Origins ==
When Konigsburg submitted Mixed-Up Files to Jean Karl at Atheneum in 1966, she was an unpublished mother of three children living in the suburbs of New York City.

One inspiration for the novel was a page-one story in the New York Times on October 26, 1965. (Note: Konigsburg later cited October 25, which was Monday. The page one story was published Tuesday, concerning a Friday auction.) Konigsburg recalled years later that the Metropolitan Museum had purchased for only $225 a plaster and stucco statue from the time of the Italian Renaissance. "They knew they had an enormous bargain."

Another inspiration was complaints by Konigsburg's children in Yellowstone National Park, about a picnic with many amenities of home. She inferred that if they ever ran away "[t]hey would certainly never consider any place less elegant than the Metropolitan Museum of Art".

The author's two younger children Laurie and Ross (who turned eleven and nine in 1967) posed for the illustrations of Claudia and Jamie. Anita Brigham, a neighbor in their Port Chester, New York apartment house, posed as Mrs. Frankweiler.

The character of Mrs. Frankweiler was based on Headmistress Olga Pratt at Bartram's School for Girls in Jacksonville, Florida, where Konigsburg once taught chemistry. "Miss Pratt was not wealthy, but she was a matter-of-fact person. Kind, but firm."

On February 21, 2014, family and friends of E. L. Konigsburg gathered in a private space at the Metropolitan Museum of Art to pay tribute to the author, who died on April 19, 2013, at age 83. One of the speakers was Paul Konigsburg, the author's son. He told a story.

During the mid-1960s, [Konigsburg] would drop off [her young son] Paul and his siblings, Laurie and Ross, at the museum, while [Konigsburg] attended her own art classes. By the time the children made their routine visits to the knights in armor, the mummy, and the Impressionists (at Laurie's request), Konigsburg's class would be finished and she would return to explore the museum with them. On one such occasion, Paul recalled, his mother spotted a single piece of popcorn on the floor next to an ornate piece of royal furniture, which was completely blocked off from public access. He remembers his mother wondering aloud, where did that popcorn come from? And it was that moment, "burned into shrapnel memory", that he believes formed the kernel of the story that would become From the Mixed-Up Files of Mrs. Basil E. Frankweiler. She was "a very special lady", he said, whose passion for art drew her to this "very special place".

== Reception ==
At the time of the book's publication, Kirkus Reviews wrote "There may be a run on the Metropolitan (a map is provided); there will surely be a run on the book." The Horn Book Magazine called the book "not only one of the most original stories of many years but one of the most humorous and one with character wholly alive." In a retrospective essay about the Newbery Medal-winning books from 1966 to 1975, children's author John Rowe Townsend wrote "Mrs. Frankweiler plays a vital part, and has an important affinity with Claudia; it is quite likely that she herself is a Claudia grown elderly...Yet the fact that Mrs. Frankweiler narrates the whole story, which she herself does not enter until near the end, seems to me to be a major structural flaw."

Mixed-Up Files won the annual Newbery Medal for excellence in American children's literature in 1968, and Konigsburg's first-published book Jennifer, Hecate, Macbeth, William McKinley, and Me, Elizabeth was one of the runners-up in the same year, the only double honor in Newbery history (from 1922). Anita Silvey covered Mixed-Up Files as one of the 100 Best Books for Children in 2005. Based on a 2007 online poll, the U.S. National Education Association listed it as one of its "Teachers' Top 100 Books for Children". In 2012 it was ranked number seven among all-time children's novels in a survey published by School Library Journal.

== Adaptations ==
The following adaptations have been released, all under the original title:

- 1969 audio cassette (Miller-Brody/Random House)
- 1973 feature film starring Ingrid Bergman (Cinema 5)—later released as The Hideaways; The Hideaways UK title and home video title.
- 1995 television film starring Lauren Bacall

== General sources ==
- Konigsburg, E.L. (1967). From the Mixed-Up Files of Mrs. Basil E. Frankweiler. Atheneum Books. ISBN 0-689-20586-4.
- Konigsburg, E.L. (2002). From the Mixed-Up Files of Mrs. Basil E. Frankweiler. Aladdin Books. ISBN 0-689-71181-6. "With a 35th anniversary afterword from the author."

Awards
Preceded by Up a Road Slowly	Newbery Medal recipient 1968	Succeeded by The High King
Preceded by Henry Reed's Baby-Sitting Service	Winner of the William Allen White Children's Book Award; 1970	Succeeded by Kävik the Wolf Dog
