= From the Mixed-Up Files of Mrs. Basil E. Frankweiler (1973 film) =

1973 film by Fielder Cook

- Directed by: Fielder Cook
- Screenplay by: Blanche Hanalis
- Based on: From the Mixed-Up Files of Mrs. Basil E. Frankweiler; 1967 novel by E.L. Konigsburg
- Produced by: Charles G. Mortimer Jr.
- Starring: Ingrid Bergman; Sally Prager; Johnny Doran
- Cinematography: Victor J. Kemper
- Edited by: Eric Albertson
- Music by: Donald Devor
- Distributed by: Cinema 5
- Release date: September 27, 1973 (U.S.)
- Running time: 105 minutes
- Country: United States
- Language: English

From the Mixed-Up Files of Mrs. Basil E. Frankweiler (released as: The Hideaways in home video releases) is a 1973 American children's film based on E.L. Konigsburg's novel From the Mixed-Up Files of Mrs. Basil E. Frankweiler. It tells the story of a girl and her brother who run away from home to live in the New York Metropolitan Museum of Art and discover what they think is a lost treasure. The film was remade as 1995 television film starring Lauren Bacall.

== Plot ==
The movie, following the plot of the book by the same name, starts with young teenager Claudia Kinkaid feeling unappreciated at her home in New Jersey, so she decides to run away, taking along her younger brother Jamie. They run away to New York City and end up at the Metropolitan Museum of Art. They stay in the museum for several nights, sleeping in beds featured in the museum, hiding from museum guards, and bathing in the fountain. For money, they grab coins out of the bottom of the fountain and use them to get food out of the vending machine. Eventually, Claudia finds a statue of an angel she believes was carved by Michelangelo, so she decides to find the previous owner of the statue, a reclusive widow, Mrs. Basil E. Frankweiler (Ingrid Bergman).

The children find Mrs. Frankweiller, who allows the children into her home. Mrs. Frankweiler plays cards (War) for money with Jamie, who loses 82 cents to her, while Claudia takes an extended bath. She sends Jamie off to play cards with her butler, Saxonberg (George Rose), implying that Saxonburg could be easily defeated, in order to have some private time with Claudia. Mrs. Frankweiler and Claudia discuss keeping secrets and Mrs. Frankweiler tells Claudia that she will leave her the secret of the angel statue in her will if she will keep this secret until her 21st birthday. Mrs. Frankweiler decides that it is time for her to open her heart and home to the world again.

== Cast ==
- Ingrid Bergman as Mrs. Frankweiler
- Sally Prager as Claudia Kincaid
- Johnny Doran as Jamie Kincaid
- George Rose as Saxonburg
- Georgann Johnson as Mrs. Kincaid
- Richard Mulligan as Mr. Kincaid
- Madeline Kahn as schoolteacher
- Bruce Conover as Kevin Kincaid
- Mike Hammett as Brucie
- Donald Symington as museum director
- Linda Selman as museum secretary

== Filming locations ==
Filming locations included The Metropolitan Museum of Art, The New York General Post Office, Macy's New York, the Erie Lackawanna Railway and Madison, New Jersey.

Specific Metropolitan Museum of Art galleries included:

- Gallery 507: Bedroom from the Palazzo Sagredo of Venice
- Gallery 162: Currently Greek and Roman hall (but at time of filming was the restaurant)
- Gallery 153: Greek and Roman Hall
- Gallery 305: Medieval Hall
- Gallery 371: Arms and Armor
- Gallery 206: Chinese Art
- Egyptian Wing
- British period rooms
- The Great Hall

== Reception ==
Roger Ebert of the Chicago Sun-Times called it a "special kind of family film that doesn’t insult the intelligence and should be especially entertaining for kids like the heroine." TV Guide called it a "somewhat dry, but still thoroughly entertaining adaptation of an excellent story."

== Other adaptations ==
From the Mixed-Up Files of Mrs. Basil E. Frankweiler was adapted into a 1995 television movie with Lauren Bacall.

== See also ==
- List of American films of 1973
