= The Second Mrs. Giaconda =

1975 novel by E. L. Konigsburg

The Second Mrs. Gioconda
- First edition
- Author: E. L. Konigsburg
- Illustrator: Leonardo da Vinci black and white museum plates
- Cover artist: Leonardo da Vinci, Heads of (an Old Man and) a Youth, c. 1495.
- Language: English
- Genre: Children's novel
- Published: 1975 (Atheneum Books)
- Publication place: United States
- Media type: Print (hardcover & paperback)
- Pages: 138 pp + 10 plates
- ISBN: 0-689-30480-3

The Second Mrs. Giaconda, later The Second Mrs. Gioconda, is a historical novel for children by E. L. Konigsburg. Set primarily in Milan, Italy, it features Leonardo da Vinci, his servant Salai, and duchess Beatrice d'Este. Through the experiences of Salai narrated in third person, it explores the background of da Vinci's Mona Lisa.

The book was published by Atheneum in 1975, manufactured by Halliday Lithograph Corporation with ten black-and-white museum plates of da Vinci paintings and drawings, of which several figure in the story. (Note: The Second Mrs. Gioconda: Online page count and paginated contents for the 1998 edition imply identical layout: text and page numbers ending page 138, followed by plates.)

== Summary ==
A prologue opens by asking, "Why did Leonardo da Vinci choose to paint the portrait of the second wife of an unimportant Florentine merchant when dukes and duchesses ... were begging for a portrait by his hand?" It introduces Salai by five quotations from Leonardo's notebooks and his will.

Early narrative chapters establish those two characters and their relationship. The son of a poor shoemaker, Salai is a cutpurse caught in the act by the master, whose grasp and visage he mistakes for the hand and face of God. Leonardo takes him as an apprentice, at no fee, and practically as a servant. Salai remains a scoundrel who moves from petty theft to selling his master's sketches, and later to selling his audiences.

Princess Beatrice comes to Milan and marries Il Moro, the duke, who had hoped to marry her beautiful older sister Isabella d'Este. He continues to wait on his beautiful mistress Cecilia Gallerani, the subject of a Da Vinci portrait that is already famous. "She's small and dark and perfectly plain", Salai says when he first sees Beatrice; when they meet by accident, she is "trying to get the sun to make me blond and beautiful". They discover a shared taste for mischief. To Leonardo she laments, "Could I but gain my husband's love, I know that I could disguise this plain brown wrapping." He asks what she has "to give him that Cecilia has not" and she volunteers her "sense of fun".

Salai and even Leonardo often visit Beatrice and she becomes the toast of Milan —assisted by the visits. They come to consider her "our duchess" but she does win her husband's love. Isabella visits and envies her sister for "the intellectuals, the gifted, the skilled craftsmen; the very elements who were drawn naturally to Beatrice."

Beatrice grows into a political role and becomes a collector of clothing, jewels, etc., and no longer a companion to Salai. She does confide disappointment in the massive Leonardo's horse, conveys insight regarding the master's talent, and admonishes Salai to take some responsibility for that. To achieve great art, Leonardo needs "something wild, something irresponsible in his work", and Salai must help.

The merchant Gioconda and his wife appear only in the last of nineteen chapters, visiting the studio during the master's absence. Beatrice has approved Leonardo's The Last Supper and died in childbirth. Milan has been conquered by the French and Leonardo has moved to Mantua. Duchess Isabella of Mantua (sister of Beatrice) has been frustrated for years seeking her portrait by Leonardo, which delights Salai. "Sooner or later she would come to realize that here was one prize that was just out of reach of her jeweled pink fingers." Spurred by Beatrice and Isabella, the irresponsible Salai determines to persuade Leonardo to paint Lisa.

== Origins ==
Konigsburg once held a "grudge" against da Vinci. She came to admire him as both an artist and a person after reading Jacob Bronowski's essay on the painter in The Horizon Book of the Renaissance. She was intrigued by Bronowski's observation that Leonardo was insecure.

== Awards ==
The American Library Association named The Second Mrs. Gioconda a Best Book of the Year for Young Adults for 1975.

== See also ==
- Cultural references to Leonardo da Vinci
