= Silent to the Bone =

2000 novel by E. L. Konigsburg

- Front cover (first hardcover)
- Author: E. L. Konigsburg
- Cover artist: E. L. Konigsburg
- Language: English
- Genre: Young adult novel, Mystery
- Publisher: Atheneum Books
- Publication date: 2000
- Publication place: United States
- Media type: Print (hardcover & paperback)
- Pages: 261 pp (first, hard)
- ISBN: 0-689-83601-5 (first edition, hard)
- OCLC: 61757595
- LC Class: PZ7.K8352 Si 2000
- Followed by: The Outcasts of 19 Schuyler Place

== Origins ==
The story is "loosely based on a real case".

== Summary ==
Silent to the Bone is a first-person narrative by Connor Kane, a 13-year-old boy. Connor's best friend Branwell Zamborska is struck dumb and taken to the Juvenile Behavioral Center when his infant sister Nicole suffers a head injury and slips into a coma. The au pair Vivian, having completed Branwell's 9-1-1 call, asserts that Branwell must have dropped Nikki.

Connor knows there is some explanation for Branwell's silence and that he did not intentionally hurt Nikki. He knows that Branwell needs him, and he visits him daily. Because Branwell does not speak, Connor does all the talking and communicates by a kind of sign language, inspired by Jean-Dominique Bauby. "Remember the story of the paralyzed Frenchman who wrote a whole book with the blink of his left eye? I no sooner had the sentence out of mouth than Branwell blinked his eyes twice, very rapidly, and I knew he understood our rules of communication." Initially he elicits clues by presenting keywords on handwritten cards, which leads to Connor writing the alphabet on the backs of these cards and pointing to the letters in order to form short phrases and eventually sentences. Connor recounts his daily visits to his older half-sister Margaret, after her workday, and together they work towards solving the mystery of why Branwell will not speak, and what happened to baby Nikki.

In Branwell's first utterance since the incident he explains that Nikki was neglected and harmed by tobacco smoke coming from Vivian and her boyfriend Morris. He also recounts two sightings of Vivian's breasts, with only one being accidental. The police cannot be told about the child abuse without also learning that Vivian saw Branwell become erect. Connor convinces Branwell to come to terms with his role in the events and stop Vivian from harming another child.

== Characters ==
Everyone lives around the university campus in Epiphany, Clarion County, New York — a fictional county in Greater New York.

Branwell Zamborska, 13, is the son of Dr. Stefan Zamborska, a genetic biologist at the university, and Linda Branwell, deceased. Branwell is very honest, smart, caring and tall. His grandparents live in Naples, Florida. Branwell's immediate family now includes step-mother Tina Nguyen and half-sister Nicole or Nikki, a baby. For years after his mother's death, Vivian was his and Nikki's babysitter. The Zamborskas live on Tower Hill near the Kanes.

Connor Kane, 13, is the son of Roderick Kane and his second wife. The Kanes live in a suburban housing development on Tower Hill. He and his half-sister Margaret like each other, but Margaret was never his babysitter, and they only know each other from her semi-formal visits. Connor and Branwell have been friends since nursery school and are now eighth grade students at the middle school downtown, where they commute by city bus.

Margaret Kane, 27, is Connor's half-sister who runs a computer consulting business. When Margaret was Connor's age, their father Kane left Margaret's mother for Connor's. Margaret remains chilled by the experience. Connor's parents are not friendly with her, but they welcome her care for Connor after school and sometimes late into the night. "Call your mother and tell her you're having dinner at the Evil Empire," she says to him one evening. Eventually she resorts to Dad's expertise as University Registrar Kane, regarding the Zamborska case; that and some prodding by Connor effect some warming between daughter and father.

(Margaret is the protagonist of The Outcasts of 19 Schuyler Place (2004), a kind of prequel to Silent to the Bone.) Yolonda, Vivian, ect.

== Themes ==
According to the School Library Journal review, the book contains "themes of communication, relationships in blended families, being different, friendship, adolescence, and shame".

An Amazon.com review stated that Silent to the Bone shows Konigsburg's "keen understanding of young people"; that it is "darker than some of her others, with a remarkably true glimpse into a young man's inner world".
