= The Phil Hendrie Show =

Radio program

The World of Phil Hendrie
- Genre: Comedy, Talk
- Running time: 3 hours Monday-Friday
- Country of origin: United States
- Home station: KEIB AM 1150
- Created by: Phil Hendrie
- Original release: 1990 – present
- Website: http://www.philhendrieshow.com

The World of Phil Hendrie is a comedy talk radio program. The show debuted in 1990 and appeared in various iterations to the present. It was syndicated throughout North America on Westwood One. It is known for outrageous guests, the majority of whom are fictional and voiced live by the host, Phil Hendrie. Though Hendrie often explains that he is doing the voices, listeners unfamiliar with the show's format are duped into believing that the guests on the show are real and are invited to call in to engage in conversation with the "guests".

Historically, the show was known as The Phil Hendrie Show. It has had previous stints airing on Premiere Networks and Talk Radio Network under that name.

== Show history ==
=== 1990–2006 ("Classic Phil") ===
The show ran for nearly 16 years, from August 1990 to June 23, 2006. Hendrie began doing voices on his program at KVEN in Ventura, California during the Gulf War when he created "Raj Fahneen," an Egyptian who demanded that George H. W. Bush wash Saddam Hussein's feet with his hair. After leaving KVEN in 1992, Hendrie did a short stint as an evening host at WSB in Atlanta before moving to WCCO in Minneapolis. Phil left WCCO on March 12, 1994, and moved to WIOD in Miami. Hendrie hosted the afternoon drive-time slot, and further developed his characters' personalities, adding their lasting traits. He garnered a large fan base there, and released three "Best Of" CDs, all of which benefited the Miami charity organization Center One. In 1996, Hendrie moved to KFI in Los Angeles to further develop his show and reach a larger audience. In 1996, Hendrie became syndicated and eventually reached around 100 affiliates.

In October 1999, Phil moved to Premiere Radio Networks, which eventually distributed his shows via the Internet.

In February 2005, Hendrie's show moved to XTRA Sports 570 (KLAC), deemed a better fit for his show's mostly male audience, though it wasn't Hendrie's idea. John Ziegler, a local Los Angeles conservative talk show host, moved into his slot on KFI.

In early 2006, Hendrie announced that he was retiring from radio. He said that he felt he had reached the limits of what he could do in “terrestrial talk radio” and expressing a desire to shift his career focus toward acting. Reruns continued on KLAC in Los Angeles through November 2006 and CKTB until April 2007. The CKTB airing featured an unofficial "best-of", airing for 3 hours every Saturday night. The program was meticulously programmed by Producer Stephen Dohnberg, who culled Hendrie bits from his own archives, archives that often featured rare and classic Hendrie segments. Each week featured a theme that was consistent with calendar events, anniversaries of historical events, and current events, among others.

=== 2007–2009 (Political commentary) ===
In June 2007, Hendrie announced he was returning to the airwaves at Talk Radio Network, starting almost exactly a year from the day of his retirement (June 25) in a later time slot (10 PM-1 AM PT).

This show's format was talk radio commentary, covering political issues and news headlines of the day. Hendrie's mock guests returned to the show after a few weeks, but they did not interact with callers. Within a month of the show's relaunch, Hendrie's show had already achieved forty affiliates, although in one notable instance Brian Maloney reported that in Boston, Hendrie affiliate WTKK saw its listenership drop 91% in the overnights after Hendrie started airing in the slot. Callers were included only sparingly in the show, starting with a segment featuring Bob Greene and an unsuspecting female caller on May 2, 2008.

=== October 2009 – June 2013 ===
In October 2009, Phil posted from his Twitter: "The Original Phil Hendrie Show has returned....." The show returned to its classic format, consisting mostly of comedy characters such as Bobbie Dooley and Steven Bosell presenting controversial topics and engaging with actual callers. The political commentary was significantly marginalized.

Talk Radio Network cancelled The Phil Hendrie Show in June 2013 amid significant acrimony.

=== June 2013 to present ===
Hendrie signed a distribution deal with Dial Global (which rebranded itself as Westwood One later that year) shortly after his contract with TRN had been cancelled. The deal will have WYD Media (the same company responsible for producing Dial Global's progressive talk offerings) produce the show while Dial Global distributes and sells advertising. The show will return to the time slot it held during its run on Premiere.

== Show format ==
The show's format was a combination of commentary and character sketches. The commentary usually addressed news headlines, political and social perspectives, and Phil's personal life, while the character sketches consisted of personalities performed by Phil. Typically, three consecutive hour-long blocks were devoted to commentary and variety, with the next three hour-long blocks consisting of character sketches. These character sketches were usually closed with several minutes of commentary and variety.

Throughout the show during the Premiere years, Phil often promoted My Friend's Place, a resource center for homeless youth based in Hollywood, California, and donated all the proceeds from the sales of his "Best Of" CDs to the center. This charity was selected after another refused because of the purported offensiveness of his show.

=== Commentary ===
Throughout the show, Hendrie provided personal opinions and commentary on his life, career, and various news stories. The number of these segments devoted to political commentary increased following the September 11, 2001 attacks, as he has become a staunch supporter of President Bush's war on terrorism. A longtime Democrat and staunchly liberal on a number of issues, Hendrie has strongly voiced opposition to the Democratic Party in recent years, accusing it of having lost touch with its core constituents and failing to adequately engage with a philosophy to win the war on terror. Beginning in June 2003, however, The Phil Hendrie Show decreased the number of "serious" segments in Hendrie's own voice and returned to the commentary-through-satire which originally made him famous. The 2007 revival of the program resembles primarily these "serious" segments.

=== Character sketches ===
Hendrie was known for his repertoire of fictional personalities, each with a controversial or irritating trait. For example, Steve Bosell is an emotionally fragile business owner who files frivolous lawsuits which he discusses in a quavering voice, while Jay Santos is a self-appointed neighborhood watch commander who oversteps his authority—often to satisfy his own sexual kinks. Occasionally the characters were performed by Hendrie to add perspective and humor to his commentaries. However, many of the hour-long segments were devoted almost entirely to character sketches. In this format, Hendrie would host a debate, performing one of his characters with a controversial issue, such as Jay Santos who enters homes randomly in order to teach home invasion awareness. After the introduction, Hendrie allowed unsuspecting listeners to call in and engage with the character. A new and outrageous element was usually introduced at that point, and by the final segment, an even larger item of controversy entered the conversation. Hendrie playing the role of good cop/bad cop, feigning indignation at the character's comments and finally hanging up on his guest.

Hendrie simply described the premise as "[we] come up with different goofy characters, and then people call in who don't know that they're fake." To accomplish this illusion, Hendrie switched back and forth between a studio microphone and a conventional telephone while speaking, creating the impression that his "guest" was a random caller. The illusion was reinforced by recorded background noises that simulated various locations, such as a bowling alley, the kitchen of a restaurant, or, on at least one occasion, a washroom. Hendrie was quite clear about the illusion, often ending the show with a remark like The guests were performed by me, Phil Hendrie, and the people that called in, they thought they were real guys. He often commented on his show that the actual point of the show was the callers' reaction to his "guests", not the guests themselves, and that he was merely illustrating his perception about the ignorance of talk radio listeners.

While Hendrie's was not the first nor the only show that featured fictional characters, it became a staple of his programming style. His guests were initially portrayed as real people, though in later years Hendrie ended his shows crediting himself for the guest's performance. In earlier shows (particularly during his stint at WIOD in Miami) Hendrie would field real complaint calls to the station in a one-on-one format with the callers, pretending to be station manager Bob Green, the station's rabbi, or in one case, "Director of Accounts" at Century Village, a local retirement community. Hendrie's only regular in-studio characters were Bud Dickman, a brain-damaged intern with a cartoonish Kermit the Frog-like voice, and Robert Leonard, a black security guard.

Hendrie has also impersonated actual celebrities and public figures on his show. Two of his most frequent impersonations were fellow radio hosts Tom Leykis (with whom Hendrie feuded) and Art Bell (whose program Hendrie enjoyed but nonetheless lampooned).
