= Beatrice Schenk de Regniers =

American writer (1914–2000)

Beatrice Schenk de Regniers (August 16, 1914—March 1, 2000) was an American writer of children's picture books.

Beatrice Schenk de Regniers was born in Lafayette, Indiana, and studied social work administration at the University of Chicago, earning her M.Ed. in 1941. During the 1940s she worked in the US and in a Yugoslav refugee camp on the Sinai Peninsula.

During the 1950s she was a free-lance writer of nonfiction, humor, short stories, and columns, as well as children's books. Her first book was The Giant Story, a picture book illustrated by Maurice Sendak, published by Harper in 1953.

From 1961 she worked at Scholastic, Inc. as the founding editor of its "Lucky Book Club", four days weekly with Monday reserved for her own writing. She retired twenty years later.

She wrote over fifty books, ten of which were published under the pseudonym of Tamara Kitt, including The Adventures of Silly Billy (1961), and The Boy Who Fooled the Giant (1963).

Illustrator Beni Montresor won the annual Caldecott Medal for May I Bring a Friend?, published by Atheneum Books in 1964.

== Selected works ==
- The Giant Story (1953), illus. Maurice Sendak
- A Little House of Your Own (1954) — autobiography
- What Can You Do with a Shoe? (1955), illus. Maurice Sendak; recolored 1997

Cats Cats Cats Cats Cats Illustrated by Bill Sokol

- The Snow Party (1959; ISBN 0-394-91647-6)
- The Little Girl and her Mother (1963; OCLC Number: 62439179)
- May I Bring a Friend? (1964; ISBN 0-689-71353-3), illus. Beni Montresor
- How Joe the Bear and Sam the Mouse Got Together (1965), illus. Brinton Turkle; (1990), illus. Bernice Myers
- Red Riding Hood: Retold in Verse for Boys and Girls to Read Themselves (1972), illus. Edward Gorey
- Laura's Story (ISBN 0-689-30677-6), illus. Jack Kent
- Penny (Lothrop, Lee & Shepard Books, 1987), illus. Betsy Lewin
- Sing a Song of Popcorn: Every Child's Book of Poems (1988; ISBN 0-340-49078-0), illus. Trina Schart Hyman, Marcia Brown, Margot Zemach, Maurice Sendak, Arnold Lobel, Marc Simont, Richard Egielski, and Leo and Diane Dillon
