= Cool Cat (book) =

Children's picture book by Nonny Hogrogian

- Author: Nonny Hogrogian
- Illustrator: Nonny Hogrogian
- Language: English
- Genre: Children's picture book
- Published: 2009 (Roaring Brook Press/Macmillian)
- Publication place: USA
- Media type: Print (hardback)
- Pages: 32 (unpaginated)
- ISBN: 9781596434295
- OCLC: 763471734

Cool Cat is a 2009 Children's picture book by Nonny Hogrogian. In this wordless book, a cat is joined by other animals to colourfully paint a ruined brown landscape.

== Reception ==
A reviewer in The Seattle Times of Cool Cat wrote "Hogrogian’s art can seem deceptively simple, but she is a picture-book master who knows how to keep readers turning the pages.", and School Library Journal wrote "Both visually and conceptually, this is a gem.".

Cool Cat has also been reviewed by Kirkus Reviews, Publishers Weekly, The Horn Book Magazine, Library Media Connection, and The Bulletin of the Center for Children's Books.
