= Sorche Nic Leodhas =

American writer

- Born: LeClaire Gowans Alger; May 20, 1898 Youngstown, Ohio, USA
- Died: November 14, 1969 (aged 71) Wilkinsburg, Pennsylvania, USA
- Notable awards: Lewis Carroll Shelf Award (1962); Newbery Honor (1963)
- Spouse: Amos Hoffman (m. 1916; death 1918): John N. Alger

LeClaire Gowans Alger (1898–1969) was an American writer better known under her pseudonym Sorche Nic Leodhas. Alger was a known librarian, working from 1915 to 1966, while the imaginary Sorche was a storyteller. She sought out traditional Scottish tales that had never been written down before. She won a Lewis Carroll Shelf Award in 1962, and a Newbery Honor for Thistle and Thyme in 1963. Her 1965 children's picture book, Always Room for One More, illustrated by Nonny Hogrogian, won the 1966 Caldecott Medal.

== Early life and education ==
LeClaire Alger was born in Youngstown, Ohio on May 20, 1898 to Louis P. and Anna Gowans. Because she was often ill, her parents opted to homeschool her, and she learned to read as a toddler. In 1929, Alger graduated from the Carnegie Library School in Pittsburgh.

== Career ==
Alger began her career working as a page at the Carnegie Library of Pittsburgh from 1915 until 1921, at which point she moved to New York City and began working at the New York Public Library. She returned to Pittsburgh in 1925 and became a librarian in 1929, retiring in 1966.

While working at the library, Alger published her first book, Jan and the Wonderful Mouth Organ, in 1939. She later published two more books using her given name: Dougal's Wish (1942) and The Golden Summer (1942). She began writing a pseudonym, Sorche Nic Leodhas, following her retirement. Following her death in 1969, her great-niece completed and published some of her unfinished manuscripts in Twelve Great Black Cats, and Other Eerie Scottish Tales (1971), illustrated by Vera Bock, whom Alger had worked with for two previous books.

== Personal life ==
Alger married Amos Hoffman in 1916, though he died two years later. By 1930, she married John N. Alger.

She lived in Pittsburgh from 1915 to 1921 before moving to New York City for four years, after which she returned to Pittsburgh.

She died on in Wilkinsburg, Pennsylvania on November 14, 1969.

== Awards ==
- Harper's Typographical Prize, 1942
- Lewis Carroll Shelf Award, 1962
- Newbery Honor, 1963
- Caldecott Medal, 1966

== Works ==
=== As Leclaire Alger ===
- Jan and the Wonderful Mouth Organ. Illustrated by Charlotte Becker. New York: Harper. 1939.
- Dougal's Wish. Illustrated by Marc Simont. New York: Harper. 1942.
- The Golden Summer. Illustrated by Aldren Watson. New York: Harper. 1942.

=== As Sorche Nic Leodhas ===
==== As author ====
- All in the Morning Early. Illustrated by Evaline Ness. New York: Holt. 1963.
- Gaelic Ghosts: Tales of the Supernatural from Scotland. Illustrated by Nonny Hogrogian. New York: Holt. 1963.
- Ghosts Go Haunting. Illustrated by Nonny Hogrogian. New York: Holt. 1965.
- Always Room for One More. Illustrated by Nonny Hogrogian. New York: Holt. 1965.
- Claymore and Kilt: Tales of Scottish Kings and Castles. Illustrated by Leo and Diane Dillon. New York: Holt. 1967.
- Sea-Spell and Moor-Magic: Tales of the Western Isles. Illustrated by Vera Bock. 1968.
- By Loch and by Lin: Tales from Scottish Ballads. Illustrated by Vera Bock. 1969.
- The Laird of Cockpen. Illustrated by Adrienne Adams. New York: Holt. 1969.
- Twelve Great Black Cats, and Other Eerie Scottish Tales. Illustrated by Vera Bock. Boston: Dutton. 1971.

==== As editor ====
- Heather and Broom: Tales of the Scottish Highland. Illustrated by Consuelo Joerns. New York: Henry Holt and Co. 1961.
- Thistle and Thyme: Tales and Legends from Scotland. Illustrated by Evaline Ness. New York: Henry Holt and Co. 1962.
- A Scottish Song Book. Illustrated by Evaline Ness. New York: Henry Holt & Co. 1969.
