= From the Mixed-Up Files of Mrs. Basil E. Frankweiler (1995 film) =

1995 film

- Cover of the 2000 DVD release.
- Genre: Comedy; Drama; Family
- Based on: From the Mixed-Up Files of Mrs. Basil E. Frankweiler by E.L. Konigsburg
- Written by: Betty Goldberg
- Directed by: Marcus Cole
- Starring: Lauren Bacall; Jean Marie Barnwell; Jesse Lee Soffer
- Music by: Ron Ramin
- Country of origin: United States
- Original language: English

Production
- Executive producer: Richard Welsh
- Producer: David A. Rosemont
- Production locations: Los Angeles County Museum of Art - 5905 Wilshire Blvd., Hancock Park, Los Angeles, California
- Cinematography: Kees Van Oostrum
- Editor: Jim Oliver
- Running time: 92 minutes
- Production company: Signboard Hill Productions

Original release
- Network: ABC
- Release: June 3, 1995

From the Mixed-Up Files of Mrs. Basil E. Frankweiler is a 1995 American made-for-television children's film based on E.L. Konigsburg's novel of the same name. The story is about a girl and her brother who run away from home to live in the New York Metropolitan Museum of Art and discover what they think is a lost treasure. The children, Claudia and Jamie, are transfixed with the treasure and won't leave without knowing what its secret is. Lauren Bacall stars in the title role.

The book previously was adapted into a 1973 feature film starring Ingrid Bergman, later released on home video as The Hideaways.

== Plot ==
Claudia is the middle child of a busy family. She is smart and responsible, often required to help her mother around the house. However, weary of the life in suburban Connecticut, she decides to find something grander. Her younger brother Jamie, along with his extensive savings from playing cards, is enlisted as her partner in crime. They run away from home to the Metropolitan Museum of Art in New York City.

Once they arrive, they spend their days in the museum, exploring and eavesdropping on different schools' guided tours. They hide in the bathrooms until after closing time and sleep in antique beds. While there they encounter "The Angel," a marble statue recently auctioned off by the elusive Mrs. Basil E. Frankweiler. The striking piece is surrounded by mystery. Many experts dispute the artist who created the work, but many suppose it to be none other than Michelangelo. Claudia becomes determined to solve the mystery of "The Angel." Claudia and Jamie spend most of their time in searching and researching new things about the statue.

The following day, the two notice a small mark at the base of the piece. After some research, they find that the mark was one that Michelangelo made on numerous works. Claudia disguises herself as an adult in order to make an appointment with a museum worker to inform them of their discovery. Contrary to her hopes, the official informs her that they knew of the mark but are unsure if it is authentic.

Jamie, homesick after a week away, catches a cold. Refusing to go home before they solve the mystery, Claudia suggests that they visit the statue's previous owner, Mrs. Frankweiler. She refuses to tell them directly, but does permit them to attempt to discover the answer for themselves. After leading them to a room lined from floor to ceiling with filing cabinets, she informs them that they have one hour to search for the truth. After 54 minutes of fruitless effort, Claudia uncovers the correct file. It contains a sketch of the sculpture from one of Michelangelo's notebooks, proving that he is, indeed, the creator. Finally appeased, the siblings permit Mrs. Frankweiler to drive them home.

== Authenticity ==
For the majority of the film, the script stays true to the action in the book. However, Claudia's posing as an adult and Jamie's cold are not present in the novel. TV Guide asserts that these changes may differ from the book but bring added drama to the film.

== Critical reception ==
TV Guide gave the film three and a half stars out of four. It declared that the film was a "somewhat dry, but still thoroughly entertaining adaptation of an excellent story." It also writes that the film "celebrates the magic and beauty of art, the fun of an adventure, and most of all, a child's need to feel important...the performances and production are first rate. The children are variously brilliant, bratty and excitable, and Lauren Bacall is appropriately dignified as Mrs. Frankweiler."

== Cast ==
- Lauren Bacall as Mrs. Basil E. Frankweiler, the keeper of the mixed-up files and donator of "The Angel"
- Jean Marie Barnwell as Claudia Eleanor Kincaid, mastermind and runaway
- Jesse Lee Soffer as James Lincoln "Jamie" Kincaid, partner in crime and money manager
- Miriam Flynn as Evelyn Kincaid, Claudia and Jamie's mother
- Mark L. Taylor as Ralph Kincaid, Claudia and Jamie's father
- M. Emmet Walsh as Morris, one of the guards at The Met
- Devon Gummersall as Steve Kincaid, another Kincaid child
- Del Hunter-White as Cora
- Warren Munson as Mr. Jordan
- Everett Wong as Bruce, Jamie's friend from whom he wins all of his card money
- Tim Haldeman as Herbert
- E.L. Konigsburg as Sarah
