= Jennifer, Hecate, Macbeth, William McKinley, and Me, Elizabeth =

Novel by E. L. Konigsburg

- First edition
- Author: E. L. Konigsburg
- Illustrator: E. L. Konigsburg
- Language: English
- Genre: Children's novel
- Publisher: Atheneum Books/Simon and Schuster
- Publication date: 1967
- Publication place: United States
- Media type: Print (hardcover and paperback)
- Pages: 128 pp (paper)
- ISBN: 0-440-44162-5 (paper)
- OCLC: 11687301

Jennifer, Hecate, Macbeth, William McKinley, and Me, Elizabeth is a children's novel by E. L. Konigsburg. It was published by Atheneum Books in 1967 and next year in the UK by Macmillan under the title Jennifer, Hecate, Macbeth and Me.

Jennifer, Hecate was the author's first book published, the same year as her second book From the Mixed-Up Files of Mrs. Basil E. Frankweiler. Mixed-Up Files won the 1968 Newbery Medal and Jennifer, Hecate won a Newbery Honor, making Konigsburg the only person to win both citations in one year. (Note: The Newbery Honor was initiated for the 1970/1971 cycle and Newbery Honors for books published before 1970 were named in retrospect.) She had submitted both manuscripts to editor Jean E. Karl, who accepted both.

== Summary ==
Jennifer, Hecate is narrated by the protagonist Elizabeth in the title. She has moved into a big apartment building in a town where almost everyone lives in a house. She doesn't yet have any friends when she meets Jennifer on her way back to school after lunch on Halloween day. Although dressed as a Pilgrim, Jennifer claims to be a real witch. After one Saturday meeting, Jennifer takes Elizabeth as an apprentice and sets weekly meetings with assignments. "For the first week...you must eat a raw egg every day. And you must bring me an egg every day. Make mine hard boiled." They meet only in school, the library, the park, or the woods between home and school. The apprenticeship is difficult for Elizabeth. Sometimes she gets mad at Jennifer, but "before I'd got Jennifer, I'd had no one."

After several weeks, they choose a long project—to prepare an ointment that conveys the ability to fly. It will also be a test for Elizabeth's promotion from apprentice. The final ingredient will be a live toad, selected in advance. During the intervening months, the toad becomes a pet. Elizabeth stops Jennifer from adding him to the brew, which terminates the ointment and their friendship. Later she realizes that her affection for the toad was part of the test.

Finally, Elizabeth deduces that Jennifer's dad is gardener at "The Estate" across the street, and they live on site. As Elizabeth proudly puts the clues together, Jennifer is walking to her door. Inside, Jennifer soon laughs and admits that the whole witch thing was just a make-believe fantasy. The two girls become normal friends who focus on reality-based pursuits.

== Origins ==
Konigsburg recognized that her children were "suburban kids, comfortable/uncomfortable kids". Their experiences were quite unlike her own, more like her former students at Bartram School for Girls in Jacksonville, Florida; they were "softly comfortable on the outside and solidly uncomfortable on the inside."

She wrote for the Book of Junior Authors that Jennifer, Hecate was "based upon what happened when my daughter was the newcomer to our apartment house in Port Chester, New York" where the family had relocated from Jacksonville in 1962.

== Controversy ==
Some controversy regarding Konigsburg's works has concerned censorship, she told Scholastic Teachers. For example, "there are people who don't like Jennifer, Hecate ... because the little girl pretends to be a witch."

== Adaptation ==
The book was turned into an NBC Children's Theatre feature titled Jennifer and Me that aired on March 3, 1973. Peabody Award winner June Reig produced, directed and wrote the special.
