= One Fine Day (book) =

1971 book by Nonny Hogrogian

- Author: Nonny Hogrogian
- Illustrator: Nonny Hogrogian
- Genre: Children's picture book
- Publisher: Macmillan Publishers
- Publication date: 1971
- Publication place: United States

One Fine Day is a children's picture book by Nonny Hogrogian. Released by Macmillan, it was the recipient of the Caldecott Medal for illustration in 1972. The story is a retelling of an Armenian folktale.

== Synopsis ==
A woman catches a fox drinking her glass of milk and cuts off his tail. The fox begs her for his tail back, and she agrees to return it if the fox replaces the milk he stole. The fox approaches a series of other animals and people, each of whom wants something in return for their help. After he has fulfilled everybody's needs, the woman sews the fox's tail back onto him.

Awards
Preceded by A Story a Story	Caldecott Medal recipient 1972	Succeeded by The Funny Little Woman
