= Arnold Ferdinand Arnold =

German born American author

Arnold Ferdinand Arnold (February 6, 1921 – January 20, 2012) was an author, game designer and cyberneticist. He became known more for his relatives and wives in later life. His first and only legal wife, Eve Arnold, was known for photography. His second never-married partner was writer Gail E. Haley. Arnold's two brothers-in-law were Theodor Gaster and Peter Drucker.

== Early life ==
Arnold, born Arnold F. Schmitz, was born into one of Germany's oldest Jewish families. His grandfather had founded one of Germany's oldest department stores, in Mainz, Kaufhaus Lahnstein. Store management was taken over by Arnold's uncle – Carl Lahnstein who became the geschäftsfuhrer upon Julius's death, and which Arnold assumed as the only surviving male of the next generation and son of Carl's only surviving sister.

After fleeing Nazi Germany less than a week after Hitler came to power, Arnold was educated in the UK at Bedales School. He later attended St. Martin's School of Art before moving to the United States.

== Career ==
Arnold followed his eldest sister to the United States where he worked as a writer and cartoonist. He was drafted into the U.S. military in 1941, and after training in South Carolina, was sent to France as a member of the 101st Airborne Division. Badly wounded after his jeep ran over a German landmine, he returned to New York where he settled into married life with Eve.

By the 1950s, Arnold was established in the New York literary world. He taught at the New School, had a one-man show at MOMA, and published his first book with Ballantine Books. He knew Ian Ballantine well and essentially became a substitute father to Ian's son Richard Ballantine. The success of the book, How To Play With Your Child, which sold over 100,000 initial copies, established Arnold as an author, and allowed the family to buy a house in Long Island Sound.

Arnold was a successful advertising and commercial designer, and created the famous Parker Brothers swirl logo, first used in 1964. He created and designed many innovative educational and teaching games for game designers through the 1960s. He designed classical record covers for EPIC Records during the 1950s.

Arnold became a national columnist with the Chicago Tribune with a weekly column on childrearing called "Parents and Their Children."

== Personal life ==
Arnold and Gail had two children.
