= Nonny Hogrogian =

American illustrator and writer (1932–2024)

- Born: May Hogrogian; May 7, 1932; New York City, U.S.
- Died: May 9, 2024 (aged 92); Holyoke, Massachusetts, U.S.
- Education: Hunter College
- Occupations: Writer; illustrator
- Spouse: David Kherdian (m. 1971)
- Writing career
- Genre: Children's literature
- Notable awards: Caldecott Medal (1966, 1972)

May "Nonny" Hogrogian (May 7, 1932 – May 9, 2024) was an American writer and illustrator, known best for children's picture books. She won two annual Caldecott Medals for U.S. children's book illustrations. From childhood she preferred folk and fairy tales, poetry, fantasy and stories. The New York Times attributes her for bringing multiculturalism to children's literature by evoking her Armenian heritage. Another children's author describes her approach to American culture as that of a patchwork quilt, rather than a melting pot.

== Biography ==
Hogrogian was born in New York City on May 7, 1932, to Mugerdich and Rakel (née Ansoorian) Hogrogian, who were born in Armenia and fled the Armenian genocide. Her parents were amateur painters and her sister became an interior designer. Hogrogian earned a B.A. in Fine Arts from Hunter College in 1953. Afterward, Hogrogian worked as a book designer at Thomas Y. Crowell Co. She studied with Antonio Frasconi and Hodaka Yoshida, and she studied art at the New School. In 1960, Crowell published her first works in King of the Kerry Fair, a book with text by Nicolete Meredith, which Hogrogian illustrated with woodcuts. Subsequently, she worked as a designer at Holt and Scribner's and as a freelance illustrator.

In 1971 Hogrogian married David Kherdian, a writer and editor. For two years they lived in Lyme Center, New Hampshire, where he was the state "poet-in-the-schools." The state university library is one repository for their works (in a joint collection). Hogrogian has illustrated some of his poetic anthologies and other works for publication. For one seven year period, they moved to a farm in Oregon with other followers of George Gurdjieff. In 2016 they moved to Armenia, but later moved back to the United States after she sustained a back injury—residing in Black Mountain, North Carolina and then in western Massachusetts.

Hogrogian died of cancer in Holyoke, Massachusetts on May 9, 2024, two days after her 92nd birthday.

== Awards ==
Hogrogian won the Caldecott Medal for illustration in 1966 and 1972. The American Library Association award annually recognizes the previous year's "most distinguished American picture book for children". Always Room for One More was written by Sorche Nic Leodhas and published by Holt, Rinehart and Winston in 1965. One Fine Day, an old Armenian tale that she retold and illustrated, was published by Macmillan US in 1971.

Hogrogian received a Caldecott Honor in 1977 for The Contest, another story she retold and illustrated.

== Works ==
=== Books ===
- Right Now
- The Cat Who Loved To Sing
- The Animal
- The First Christmas
- By Myself
- Juna's Journey
- The Great Fishing Contest
- The Song of the Stork
- Always Room for One More
- Cool Cat
- The Contest
- One Fine Day
- Ghosts Go Haunting
