= T-Backs, T-Shirts, COAT, and Suit =

1993 young adult novel by E.L. Konigsburg

- First edition cover
- Author: E. L. Konigsburg
- Publisher: Atheneum Press
- Publication date: October 29, 1993
- ISBN: 0-689-31855-3

T-Backs, T-Shirts, COAT, and Suit (1993) is a young adult novel by American writer E.L. Konigsburg.

== Plot ==
Chloë Pollack, in order to evade the pressures of her friends, agrees to spend the summer with her stepfather Nick's sister Bernadette, whom Chloë hasn't seen since Nick married her mother. At first, Chloë and Bernadette seem a poor match in personality and lifestyle, but Chloë has promised Nick to "help" Bernadette, and to "give the unexpected a chance".

Chloë goes to work in Bernadette's food van, and soon becomes a close part of her life. Bernadette teaches Chloë to swim; they both take up rollerblading; and share duties around the house, especially with Bernadette's dog, Daisy. Along the way, Chloë begins to learn of Bernadette's past, how she raised Nick, how they spent time in a commune, how she got Daisy, and what led her to her present life.

Their new bond is threatened by the pressure from coworkers for Bernadette to wear a "t-back" (thong) which has been promoting sales, from the opposition group COAT which wants to ban t-backs, and from a religious group that has come to the conclusion that Bernadette is a witch based on a ruse Chloë attempted on a rival boy.

In the end, what Chloë learns most is the danger of conformism.

== Publication details ==
- T-Backs, T-Shirts, COAT, and Suit. Atheneum. 1993. ISBN 0-689-31855-3.
