= May I Bring a Friend? =

1964 picture book by Beatrice Schenk De Regniers

- Author: Beatrice Schenk de Regniers
- Illustrator: Beni Montresor
- Cover artist: Montresor
- Genre: Children's book
- Publisher: Atheneum Books
- Publication date: September 8, 1964
- Publication place: United States
- ISBN: 0-689-20615-1
- OCLC: 20016033
- Dewey Decimal: [E] 20
- LC Class: PZ8.3.D443 May 1989

May I Bring a Friend? is a 1964 book by American writer Beatrice Schenk de Regniers, illustrated by Beni Montresor, and published by Atheneum Books for Young Readers. It tells the story of a well-mannered boy who frequently gets invited to visit the king and queen. The first time he goes, he asks if he can bring a friend the next time he visits. When they say yes, he always brings different types of exotic animals who are also well mannered. Montresor won the Caldecott Medal for the book's jewel-like illustrations.

Awards
Preceded by Where the Wild Things Are	Caldecott Medal recipient 1965	Succeeded by Always Room for One More
