= A Story, a Story =

1970 book by Gail E. Haley

- Front cover, designed by MOO
- Author: Gail E. Haley
- Illustrator: Gail E. Haley
- Cover artist: G. Haley
- Genre: children's book
- Publisher: Atheneum
- Publication date: 1970
- Publication place: United States
- ISBN: 0-689-71201-4
- OCLC: 16353859
- Dewey Decimal: 398.2/096 E 19
- LC Class: PZ8.1.H139 St 1988

A Story, a Story is a children's picture book written and illustrated by Gail E. Haley that retells the African tale of how the trickster Anansi obtained stories from the Sky God to give to the children of the earth. The book was produced after Gail E. Haley spent a year in the Caribbean researching the African roots of many Caribbean tales. Released by Atheneum, it was the recipient of the Caldecott Medal for illustration in 1971.

== In other media ==
The book was animated by filmmaker Gene Deitch for Weston Woods Studios in 1971. The animation was carried out at Kratky Film Prague, with the narration by Dr John Akar and "African music recreated" by Dr Václav Kubica using African instruments loaned from the Náprstek Museum Prague. The film was named to the ALA Notable Children's Videos list in 1973.

Awards
Preceded by Sylvester and the Magic Pebble	Caldecott Medal recipient 1971	Succeeded by One Fine Day
