= Beni Montresor =

Italian illustrator, costume and set designer, director

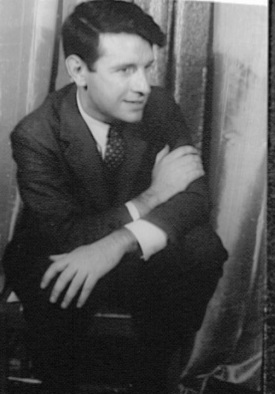
Beni Montresor, Photographed by Carl Van Vechten, 1964.

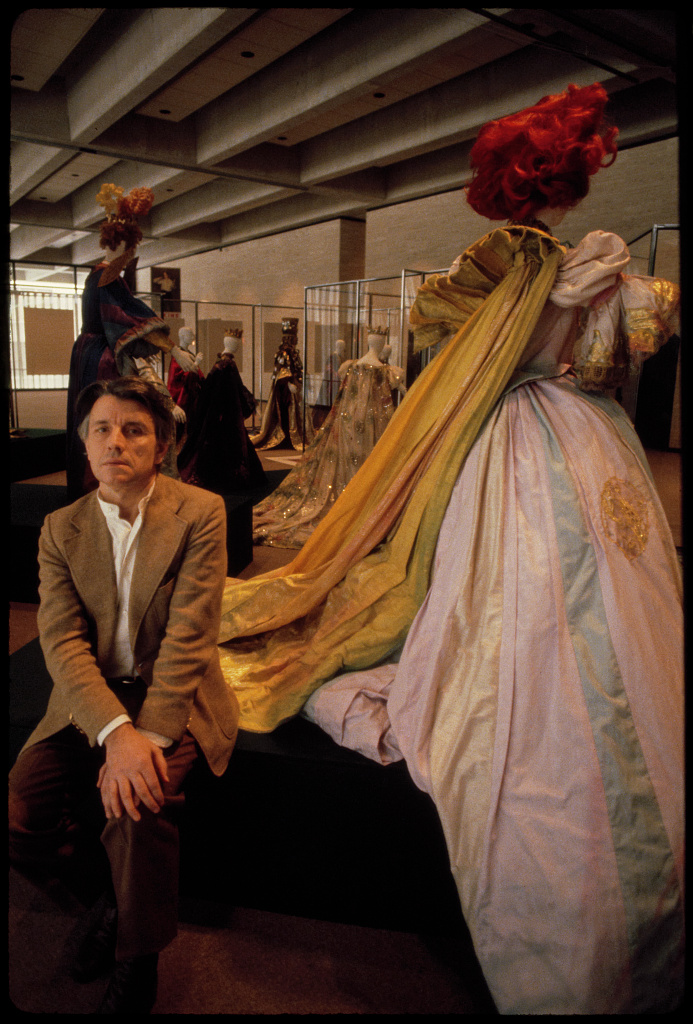
Montresor in 1981

Beni Montresor (31 March 1926 – 11 October 2001) was an Italian artist, opera and film director, set designer, author and children's book illustrator. He won the 1965 Caldecott Medal for U.S. picture book illustration, recognizing May I Bring a Friend?. The Italian government knighted him in 1966 for his contributions to the arts.

== Career ==
Montresor was particularly known in the United States as a designer of sets, lighting and costumes for opera. He designed sets and costumes for the 1964 American premiere of Gian Carlo Menotti's opera The Last Savage at the Metropolitan Opera. He also designed the evocative and ephemeral scenery and lighting for the Washington Opera/New York City Opera revival of the Montemezzi opera The Love of Three Kings in 1981. He was the Artistic Director of the Teatro dell'Opera di Roma in 1988–1989. He directed two films, Pilgrimage (1972), starring Cliff De Young and La Messe dorée (1975), starring Lucia Bosè. He was also a stage and film set designer with commissions from La Scala, Spoleto, the Glyndebourne Festival, the New York City Opera and the Metropolitan Opera for productions like La Gioconda, Esclarmonde, The Last Savage, The Daughter of the Regiment, L'Elisir d'Amore (Metropolitan Opera), Aida and The Magic Flute (New York City Opera). Montresor worked with film directors Federico Fellini, Vittorio De Sica and Roberto Rossellini among others.

Between 1964 and 1986, Montresor also designed for a Broadway play revival (Marco Millions) and two new musicals (Do I Hear a Waltz? and Rags).

== Personal life and death ==
Montresor had a long-term affair with the writer Anne Cumming in the 1950s whilst she was married and also had many other gay and straight affairs.

Beni Montresor died in Verona on 11 October 2001 at the age of 75; the cause of his death was reportedly pancreatic cancer.
