= E. L. Konigsburg =

American writer (1930–2013)

- Born: Elaine Lobl; February 10, 1930; New York City, U.S.
- Died: April 19, 2013 (aged 83); Falls Church, Virginia, U.S.
- Education: Carnegie Mellon University (Carnegie Institute of Technology)
- Occupations: Writer and illustrator
- Spouse: David Konigsburg (m. 1952; died 2001)
- Children: 3
- Writing career
- Period: 1967–2013
- Genres: Children's novels, short stories, picture books
- Notable works: • From the Mixed-Up Files of Mrs. Basil E. Frankweiler; • Father's Arcane Daughter; • The View from Saturday
- Notable awards: Newbery Medal; 1968, 1997; Phoenix Award; 1999

Elaine Lobl Konigsburg (February 10, 1930 – April 19, 2013) was an American writer and illustrator of children's books and young adult fiction. She is one of seven writers to win two Newbery Medals, the venerable American Library Association award for the year's "most distinguished contribution to American children's literature, and the only author to win the medal and receive an honor in the same year"

Konigsburg submitted her first two manuscripts to editor Jean Karl at Atheneum Publishers in 1966, and both were published in 1967: Jennifer, Hecate, Macbeth, William McKinley, and Me, Elizabeth and From the Mixed-Up Files of Mrs. Basil E. Frankweiler. From the Mixed-Up Files of Mrs. Basil E. Frankweiler won the 1968 Newbery Medal, and Jennifer, Hecate, Macbeth, William McKinley, and Me, Elizabeth was listed as a runner-up in the same year, making Konigsburg the only author to win the Newbery Medal and have another book listed as runner-up (Note: Newbery runner-ups are now known as the Newbery Honor, starting with the 1971 recipients. Recipients prior to 1971 may also be retroactively referred to as having received the Newbery Honor.) in the same year. She won again for The View from Saturday in 1997, 29 years later, the longest span between two Newberys awarded to one author.

For her contribution as a children's writer Konigsburg was U.S. nominee in 2006 for the biennial, international Hans Christian Andersen Award, the highest international recognition available to creators of children's books.

== Biography ==
Elaine Lobl was born in New York City on February 10, 1930, but grew up in small Pennsylvania towns, the second of three daughters. She was born to two Jewish immigrants who moved from New York City to a mill town in Pennsylvania. She was an avid reader, although reading was only "tolerated" in her family, "not sanctioned like dusting furniture or baking cookies". She was high school valedictorian in Farrell, Pennsylvania, where there was no guidance counseling and she never heard of scholarships. To earn money for college, she worked as a bookkeeper at a meat plant, where she met David Konigsburg, the brother of one of the owners.

Elaine entered Carnegie Institute of Technology (now Carnegie Mellon University) in Pittsburgh, Pennsylvania and majored in chemistry, with her "artistic side ... essentially dormant", because she was good at it and the purpose of college was "to become a something - a librarian, a teacher, a chemist, a something". She graduated in 1952 and was the first person in her family to earn a degree. After graduating, Elaine married David, who was then a graduate student in psychology. She started graduate school in chemistry at the University of Pittsburgh (1952 to 1954) but they moved to Jacksonville, Florida, after he attained his doctorate. She worked as a science teacher at the Bartram School for Girls until 1955; became the mother of three children, Paul, Laurie, and Ross (1955 to 1959); began painting at adult education after two children; and planned for the time they would all be in school.

Konigsburg took the new direction after the family moved to Port Chester in Greater New York (1962), where she continued art lessons and joined the Art Students League. She began to write in the mornings when her third child started school. Her first published story Jennifer, Hecate was inspired by Laurie's experience as a new girl in Port Chester. Mixed-Up Files was inspired by her children's complaints about a picnic with many amenities of home; she inferred that if they ever ran away "[t]hey would certainly never consider any place less elegant than the Metropolitan Museum of Art."

Konigsburg learned of those first two books' 1968 Newbery Award and honorable mention during her family's move back from Port Chester to Jacksonville. When she composed her autobiographical statement for The Book of Junior Authors (2000), she lived "on the beach in North Florida". The pieces of The View From Saturday (1996) had come together when she "left my desk and took a walk along the beach".

As summarized by critic Marah Gubar, "For five decades, Konigsburg challenged readers by tackling subjects often avoided in children’s books, from the undercurrent of hostility that runs through an interracial friendship to the domestic unrest generated by the stirrings of pubescent and parental sexuality... Konigsburg was committed to depicting young people as capable knowers of what goes on in their own minds, homes, and the wider world they inhabit. Bad things happen in her novels when adult characters fail to respect this competence. At the same time, however, Konigsburg emphasizes that all knowledge is perspectival; the particular social position that each of us inhabits shapes what we know and how we come to know it."

Along with chapter books, some of which she illustrated, Konigsburg is the writer and illustrator of three 1990s picture books "featuring her own grandchildren": Samuel Todd's Book of Great Colors, Samuel Todd's Book of Great Inventions, and Amy Elizabeth Explores Bloomingdale's.

== Personal life ==
In 1952, she married David Konigsburg, with whom she had three children, Paul (born 1955), Laurie (born 1956), and Ross (born 1959). As of 2002, she had five grandchildren, Samuel Todd and Amy Elizabeth being the eldest children of Laurie and Ross. Her husband, David Konigsburg, died in 2001.

Konigsburg died in Falls Church, Virginia, on April 19, 2013, from complications of a stroke that she had suffered a week prior. She was 83.

Konigsburg was a longtime resident of Jacksonville, Florida, and Ponte Vedra Beach, Florida.

== Themes ==
Many of Konigsburg's stories feature childhood and adolescent struggles that are easy for school-age readers to understand. Often her characters are striving to find the answers to big questions that will help shape their identities. Many of them are based on her own experiences as a child, the observations she made of children while a teacher, and the experiences or observations of her children.

Especially her characters are "softly comfortable on the outside and solidly uncomfortable on the inside". Teaching at Bartram, she learned that supposed "spoiled young women who had it all [actually] had all the creature comforts of the world, but ... were just as uncomfortable inside as I was when I was growing up." Later she realized that her own children were middle-class suburban kids with comforts unlike her own. She has written about "their kind of growing up, something that addressed the problems that come about even though you don't have to worry if you wear out your shoes whether your parents can buy you a new pair, something that tackles the basic problems of who am I?"

She has told Scholastic Teachers, "The essential problems remain the same. The kids I write about are asking for the same things I wanted. They want two contradictory things. They want to be the same as everyone else, and they want to be different from everyone else.They want acceptance for both."

== Works ==
Konigsburg is the author of the following books; those she illustrated are noted ("illus. ELK"). (Note: The biographical essay "E(laine) L(obl) Konigsburg 1930–" identifies all the works illustrated by Konigsburg herself, the alternative titles of UK editions, the adaptations listed here, and audio recordings not listed here.) She said that Father's Arcane Daughter is sometimes her favorite book and Eleanor of Aquitaine is the person that she would most like to meet. Her work has been translated and published in multiple languages, including Korean.

- Jennifer, Hecate, Macbeth, William McKinley, and Me, Elizabeth (1967), illus. ELK - 1968 UK title, Jennifer, Hecate, Macbeth, and Me
- From the Mixed-Up Files of Mrs. Basil E. Frankweiler (1967), illus. ELK
- About the B'nai Bagels (1969), illus. ELK
- (George) (1970), illus. ELK - 1974 UK title, Benjamin Dickenson Carr and His (George)
- Altogether, One at a Time (1971), short story collection
- A Proud Taste for Scarlet and Miniver (1973), illus. ELK, historical novel featuring Eleanor of Aquitaine
- The Dragon in the Ghetto Caper (1974), illus. ELK
- The Second Mrs. Giaconda (1975), historical novel featuring Leonardo da Vinci - also published as The Second Mrs. Gioconda
- Father's Arcane Daughter (1976) - later published as My Father's Daughter
- Throwing Shadows (1979), short story collection
- Journey to an 800 Number (1982) - 1983 UK title, Journey by First Class Camel
- Up from Jericho Tel (1986)
- Samuel Todd's Book of Great Colors (1990), picture book, illus. ELK
- Samuel Todd's Book of Great Inventions (1991), picture book, illus. ELK
- Amy Elizabeth Explores Bloomingdale's (1992), picture book, illus. ELK
- T-Backs, T-Shirts, COAT, and Suit (1993)
- TalkTalk: A Children's Book Author Speaks to Grown-ups (1995), nine lectures and speeches
- The View from Saturday (1996)
- Silent to the Bone (2000)
- The Outcasts of 19 Schuyler Place (2004)
- The Mysterious Edge of the Heroic World (2007)

== Adaptations ==
Beside audiobook recordings, four of Konigsburg's novels have been adapted and produced as movies or plays.

- From the Mixed-Up Files of Mrs. Basil E. Frankweiler: 1973 film starring Ingrid Bergman (Cinema 5), released 1974 as "The Hideaways" (Bing Crosby Productions); and a 1995 film starring Lauren Bacall released on television.
- Jennifer, Hecate, Macbeth, William McKinley, and Me, Elizabeth: 1973 television movie "Jennifer and Me" (NBC)
- The Second Mrs. Giaconda: 1976 production of a play (Jacksonville FL)
- Father's Arcane Daughter: 1990 television movie "Caroline?" (Hallmark Hall of Fame)

== Awards ==
- Jennifer, Hecate, Macbeth, William McKinley, and Me, Elizabeth: 1968 Newbery Honor
- From the Mixed-Up Files of Mrs. Basil E. Frankweiler: 1968 Newbery Medal, named to the Lewis Carroll Shelf Award list in 1968; 1970 William Allen White Children's Book Award
- The View from Saturday: 1997 Newbery Medal
- 1995 Honorary membership in Phi Beta Kappa from Carnegie Mellon University
- 1999 Distinguished Alumni Achievement Award from Carnegie Mellon University

Two books by Konigsburg were finalists for the National Book Award in "Children's" categories (1969 to 1983), the historical novel A Proud Taste for Scarlet and Miniver in 1974 and the short story collection Throwing Shadows in 1980. A Proud Taste was the 1993 Phoenix Award runner-up and Throwing Shadows won the 1999 Phoenix. That Children's Literature Association award recognizes the best children's book published 20 years earlier that did not win a major award; it is named for the mythical bird phoenix, which is reborn from its ashes, to suggest the winning book's rise from obscurity.
