= The View from Saturday =

1996 novel by E. L. Konigsburg

- First edition cover
- Author: E. L. Konigsburg
- Cover artist: E. L. Konigsburg
- Language: English
- Genre: Children's novel
- Publisher: Atheneum Books an imprint of Simon and Schuster
- Publication date: 1996
- Publication place: United States
- Media type: Print (hardcover & paperback)
- Pages: 160 (first, hard)
- ISBN: 0-689-80993-X (first edition, soft)
- OCLC: 33983334
- LC Class: PZ7.K8352 Vi 1996

The View from Saturday is a children's novel by E. L. Konigsburg, published by Atheneum Books for Young Readers in 1996. It won the 1997 Newbery Medal for excellence in American children's literature, the author's second Medal.

== Structure ==
Narrative mode alternates between first-person limited and third-person omniscient. In the first person, four students and quiz teammates narrate one chapter each, "deftly prefaced by a question tailor-made for introducing the respective team members".

According to Konigsburg,

I thought children would enjoy meeting one character, and then two characters, and that they would enjoy seeing parts of the story repeated but in a different way. I thought that they would enjoy having the second character interact with the first character, with each story moving the general story along. And I had hoped that readers would feel very satisfied with themselves when they had it all worked out.

Present publisher Simon & Schuster labels the book for ages 8–12, grades 4-6, but the parental guide Common Sense Media capsule is "Brilliant but complex novel for older kids". "[S]uperb writing and characters make for a great story, but complexities of plot and style may leave some readers frustrated or bored."

== Summary ==
Middle school teacher Eva Marie Olinski returns to teaching after an accident left her paraplegic. She chooses four of her sixth-grade students (Ethan, Noah, Nadia, and Julian), who form a group they call 'The Souls', to represent her class in the Academic Bowl competition. They defeat the other sixth-grade teams, then the seventh- and eighth-grade champions at Epiphany, and so on until they become New York state middle school champions. The children help their teacher live a happier life after her win. A child named Hamilton Knapp makes fun of her and makes life harder for her. Later The Souls stick out their arms and legs when Mrs. Olinski stands up for herself when Hamilton and his follower Jared Lord harass the class. They stick out their limbs to show that she can stand up for herself.

Between chapters that feature the progress of the competition, each of the four students narrates one chapter related both to the development of The Souls and to a question in the state championship final. Noah Gershom recounts learning calligraphy and being best man for his grandfather's friend at his wedding in Century Village in Florida. Nadia Diamondstein describes working to conserve sea turtles and meeting Ethan, also at Century Village. Ethan Potter tells of meeting Julian, a new boy in town, and attending his tea parties, where the four Souls became friends. Julian Singh explains being new at school and tells of handling a chance for revenge against one of the bullies — remarkably grounded in the part played by Nadia's dog, Ginger in the school musical name 'The Orphan Annie'.

== Characters ==
- Mrs. Eva Marie Olinski teaches at Epiphany Middle School. She feels that sixth-grade students have descended from “Now what?” to "So what?" during the years she has been away. Once shaken by her injury (car crash) and left paraplegic, she has suffered also from how students receive her. The four Souls respect her and help restore her confidence as a teacher.
- Noah Gershom has brown hair and wears glasses. His mother is a real estate agent and his father is a dentist who employs Nadia's mom. In Noah's story, he visits his grandparents who reside in a retirement home in Florida, where he unexpectedly has an opportunity to learn calligraphy. He accidentally becomes the best man at the wedding of Izzy Diamondstein and Margaret Draper.
- Nadia Diamondstein is a beautiful plump girl with curly red hair, which notably forms a halo in the sunlight. She recently moved to New York from Florida with her mother, who works as a dental hygienist for Noah's father. Her father is an accountant in Florida, where grandfather Izzy Diamondstein recently married Ethan's grandmother Margaret Draper, formerly a principal and Mrs. Olinski's best friend. In the school play, Nadia's dog Ginger plays Little Orphan Annie's dog Sandy. She has a fondness for sea turtles.
- Ethan Potter is a medium-sized boy with short, blond hair. He lives on a farm, and his family is one of the oldest in Epiphany. His grandmother, Margaret Draper, a teacher who retired to Florida, recently married Nadia's grandfather Izzy Diamondstein. Aware that he tends to disappoint his teachers, who compare and expect him to excel academically and athletically like his older brother, Lucas, or Luke, Ethan is a quiet and nervous individual until he becomes a part of the Souls. He loves theater, staging included, and has a secret passion for halos. His family's goal for him is to be a farmer while Lucas goes all around the world.
- Julian Singh is an Indian boy with black hair and a British accent that he acquired as a boarding school student in England. His mother was a chanteuse, or singer, on a cruise ship who died young. His father is a cook and now an innkeeper at a farm in Epiphany that he has made into a bed and breakfast inn. There Julian has been "facilitator" of the four Souls, as host of 4:00 pm tea every Saturday. Julian was teased and bullied by other students this year, as a new boy from another culture. That was a learning experience, especially for Ethan. Julian is the last chosen for the quiz team, the missing piece from Mrs. Olinski's perspective.
- Hamilton Knapp is the antagonist of the story and is the character who wrote the non school appropriate message on Julian Singh's backpack. Hamilton Knapp was almost the 4th member of the academic bowl team. Hamilton Knapp tried to drug Ginger in the play Little Orphan Annie's dog Sandy.

Konigsburg tells Scholastic Teachers regarding all of her books that "the characters begin their lives as people that I may know, but they end up their lives as characters!" She considers the friendship of the four Souls unusual but not unreal. She believes that she has something in common with them: "There are parts in each of them that I relate to. Noah's resistance to authority, for example. Ethan's challenge for having a high-achieving sibling. Nadia's sense of having been abandoned. And I hope, Julian's kindness and outsiderness. Julian was the most outside of all of those children." There is a metaphor in every symbol.

== Origins ==
Konigsburg started the story of Ethan Potter's school bus ride on the first day of sixth grade. "A strangely dressed young man", Julian sat next to him and explained that father was opening a "bed-and-breakfast" B&B. She took a break, walking along the beach, and recalled three other short stories in her files: one about a boy Noah who must write a "bread-and-butter" B&B letter to his grandparents; one about a dog Ginger who plays the dog Sandy in Annie; one about an Academic Bowl team. She realized that the stories would complement each other in a whole "more than the sum of the parts. I knew that kids would love meeting one character and then two and three and four ... and they would think that fitting all the stories together was part of the adventure."

== Notes ==
Awards
Preceded by The Midwife's Apprentice	Newbery Medal recipient 1997	Succeeded by Out of the Dust
