= 2024 deaths in the United States (January–March) =

- Decades: 2000s; 2010s; 2020s; 2030s
- See also: History of the United States (2016–present); Timeline of United States history (2010–present); List of years in the United States

The following notable deaths in the United States occurred in January–March 2024. Names are reported under the date of death, in alphabetical order as set out in WP:NAMESORT. A typical entry reports information in the following sequence: Name, age, country of citizenship at birth and subsequent nationality (if applicable), what subject was noted for, year of birth (if known), and reference.

== January ==
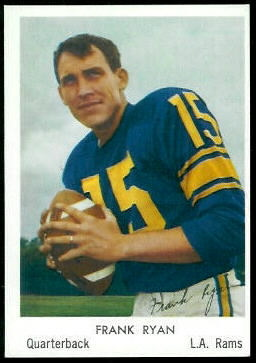
Frank Ryan

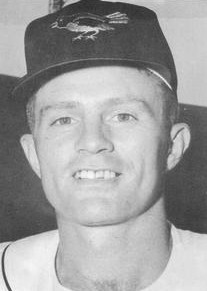
Billy Gardner

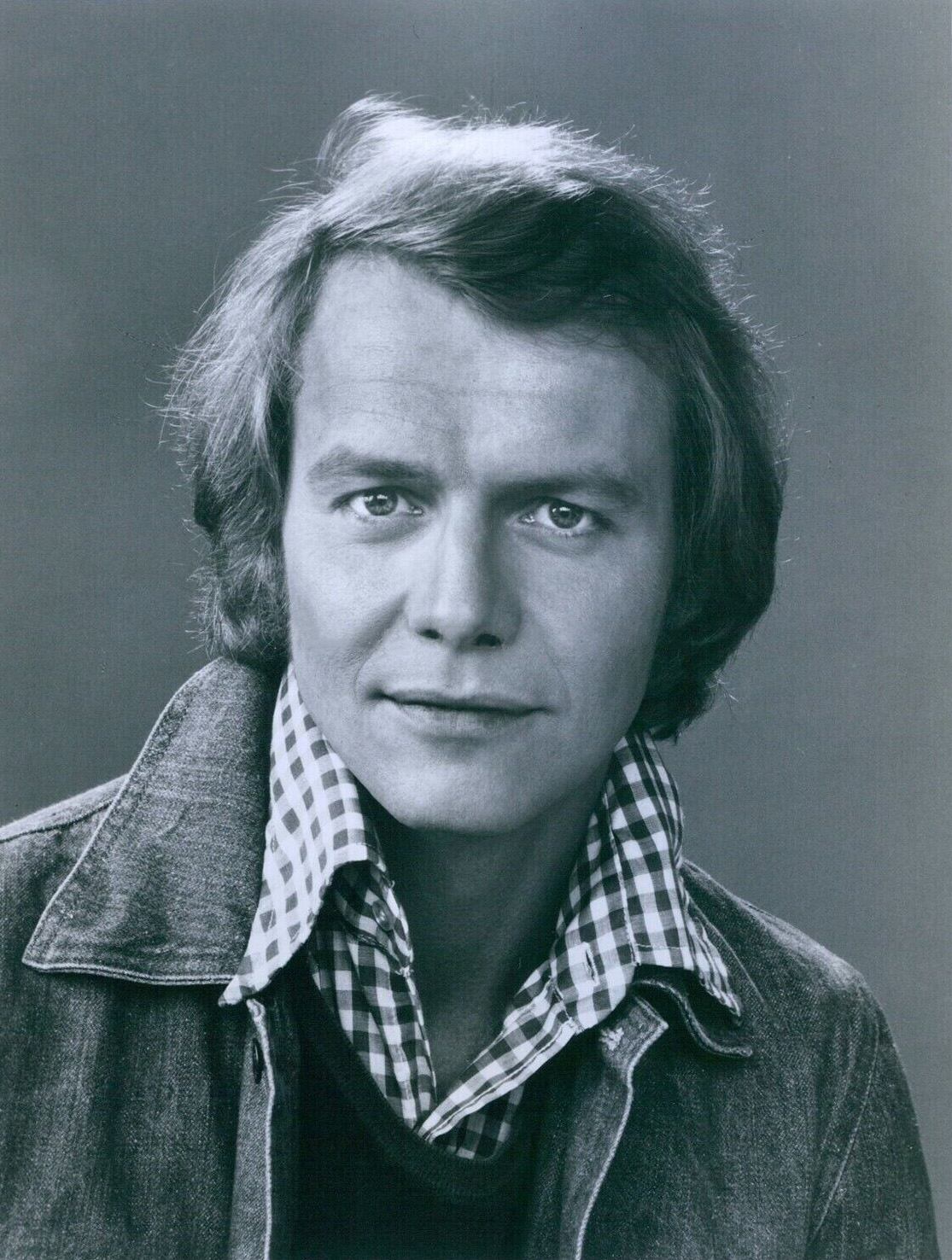
David Soul

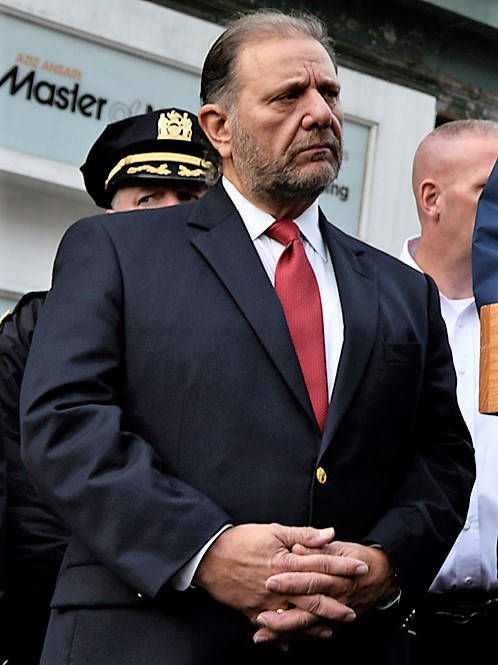
Joseph Esposito

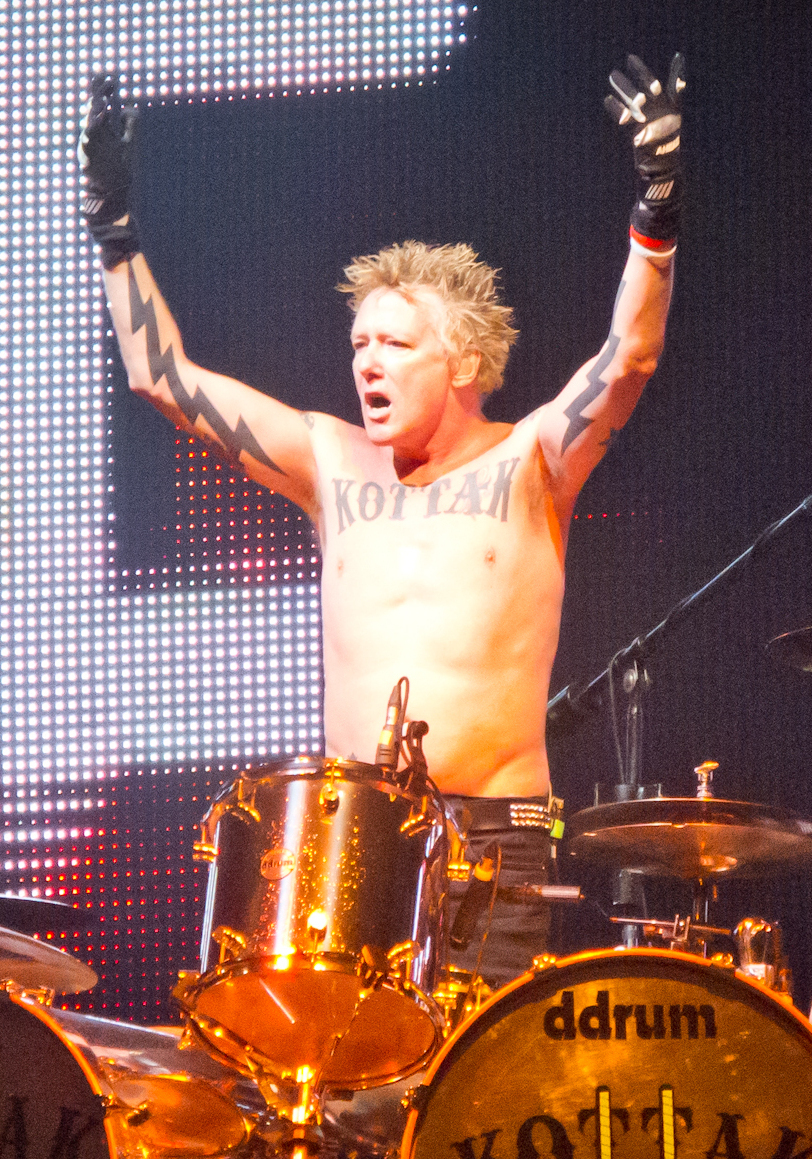
James Kottak

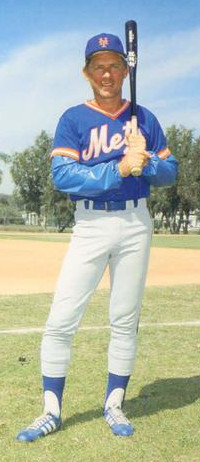
Bud Harrelson

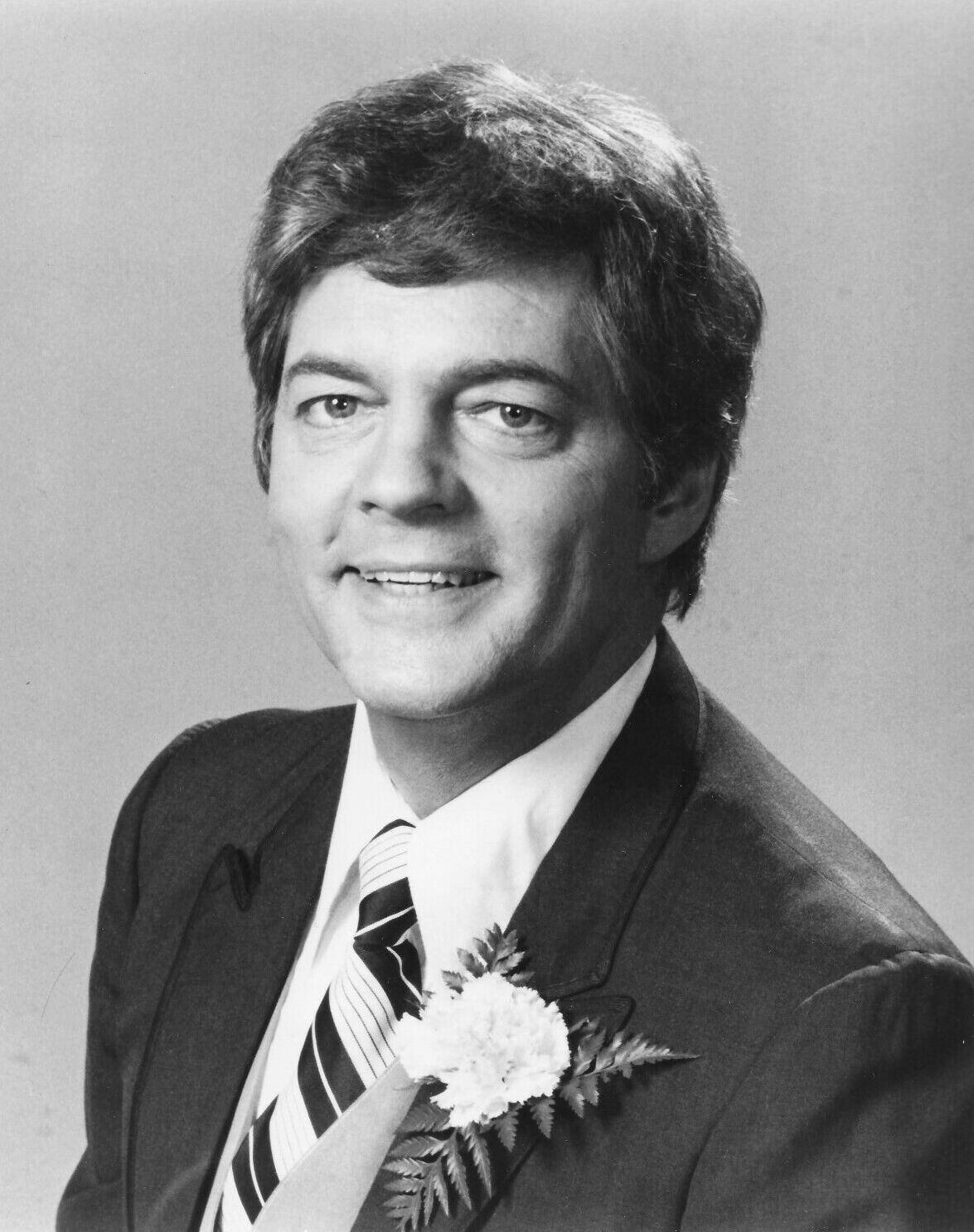
Bill Hayes

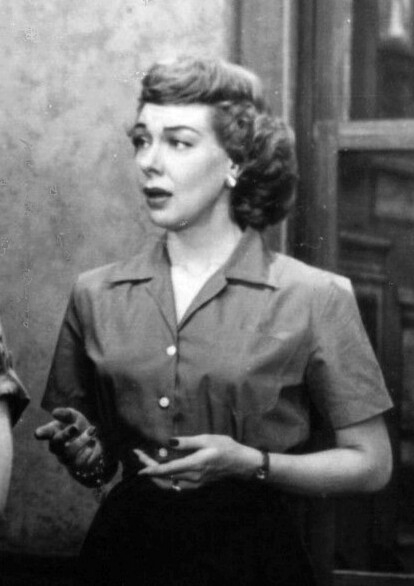
Joyce Randolph

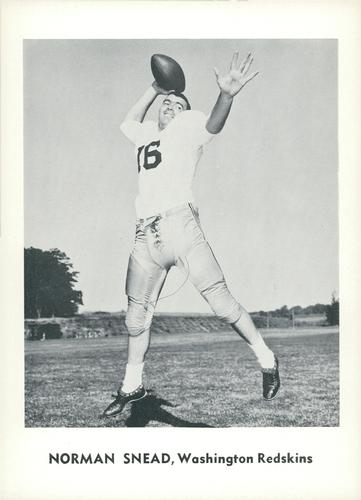
Norm Snead

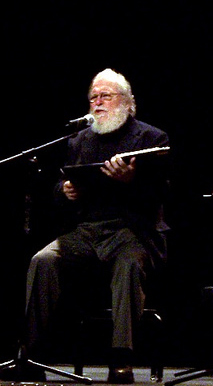
Peter Schickele

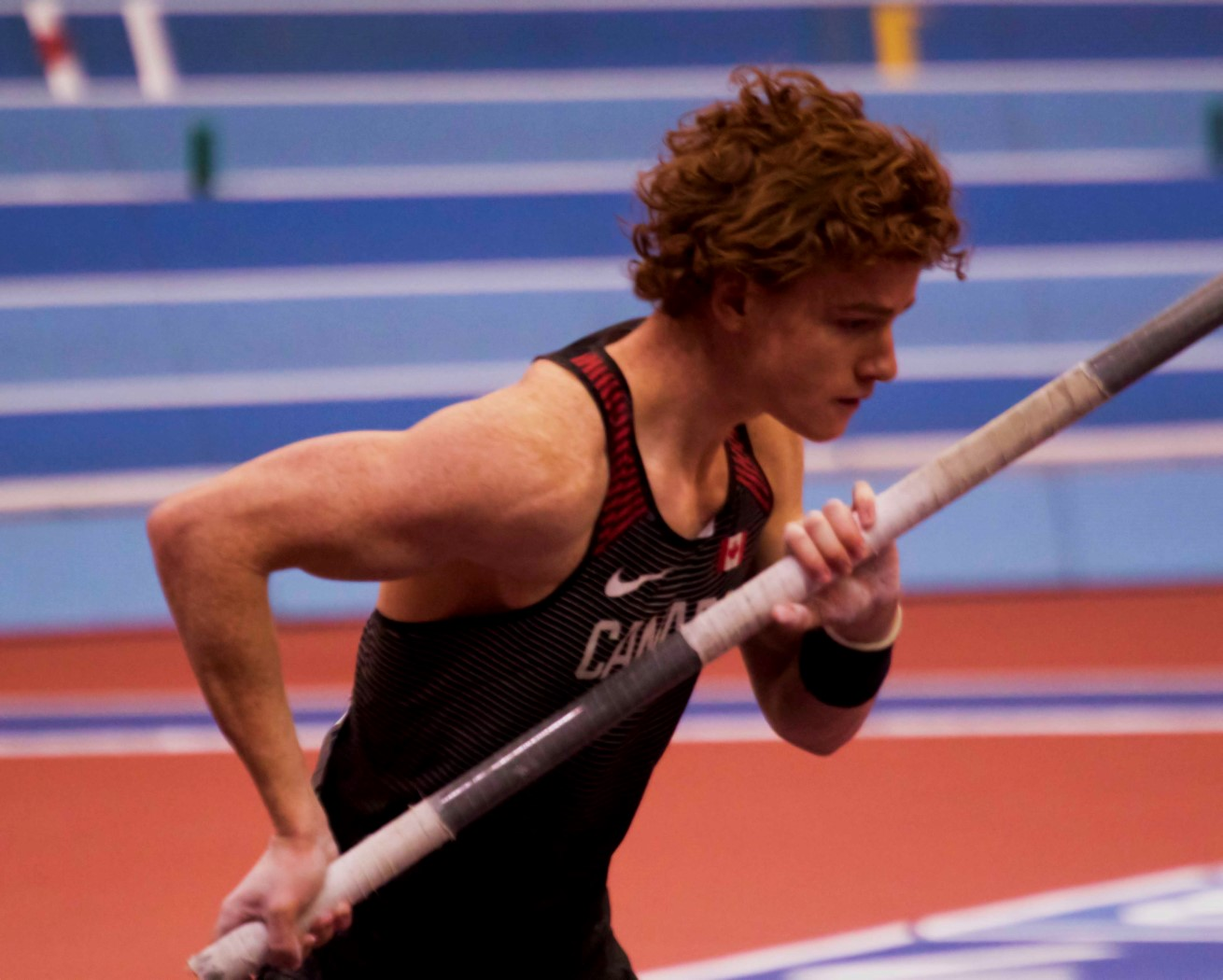
Shawn Barber

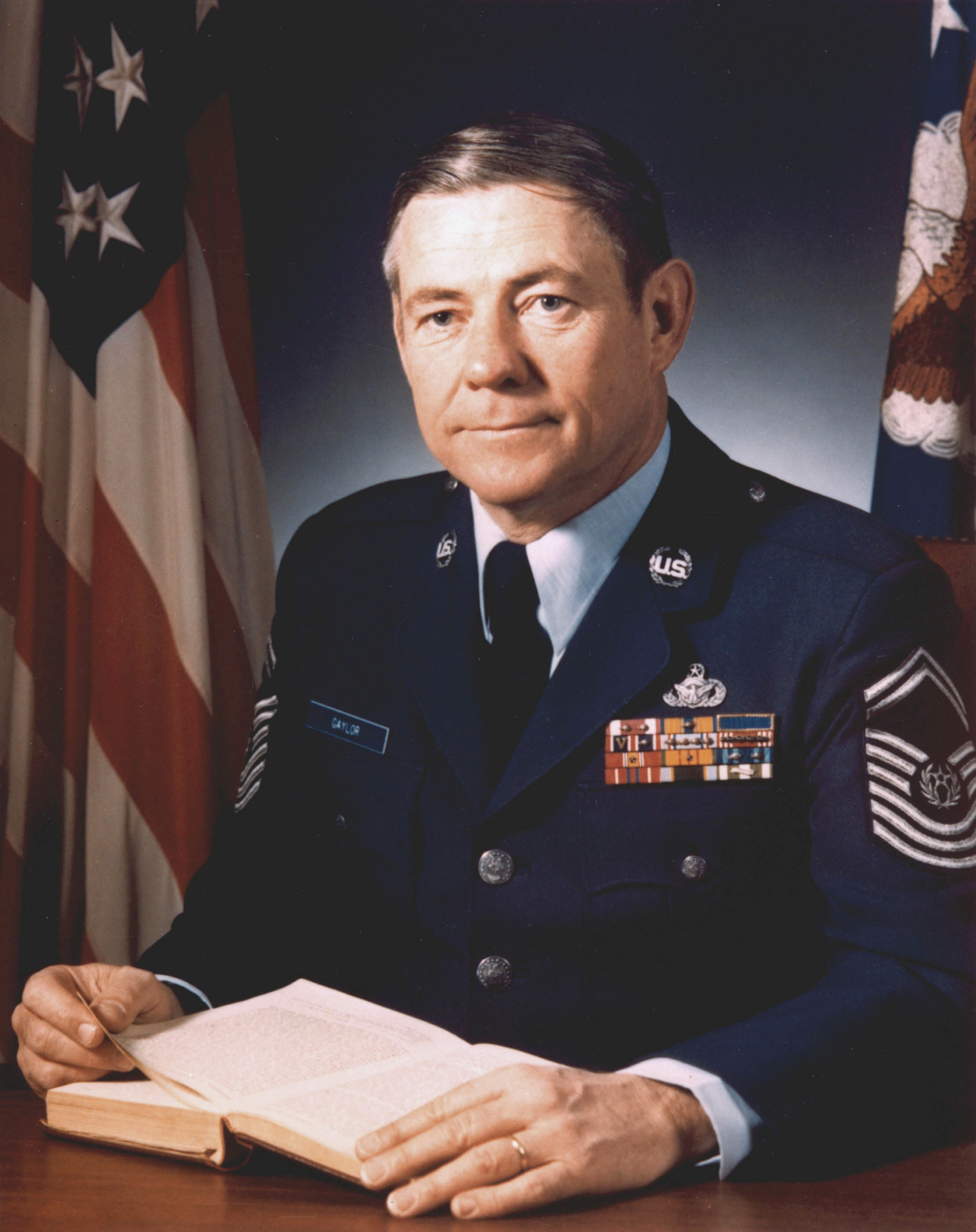
Robert Gaylor

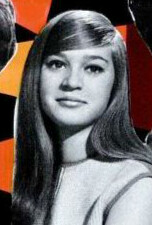
Mary Weiss

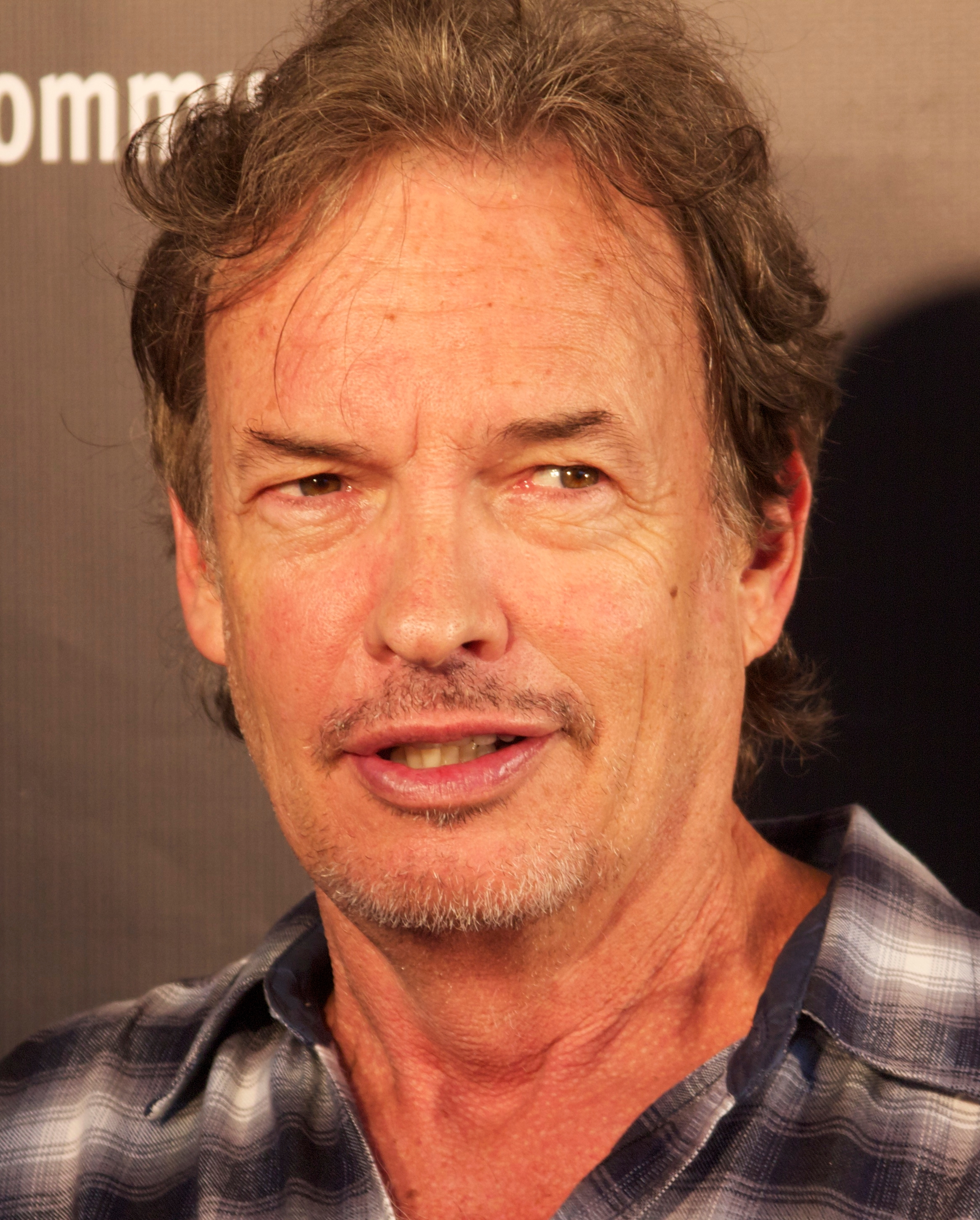
Gary Graham

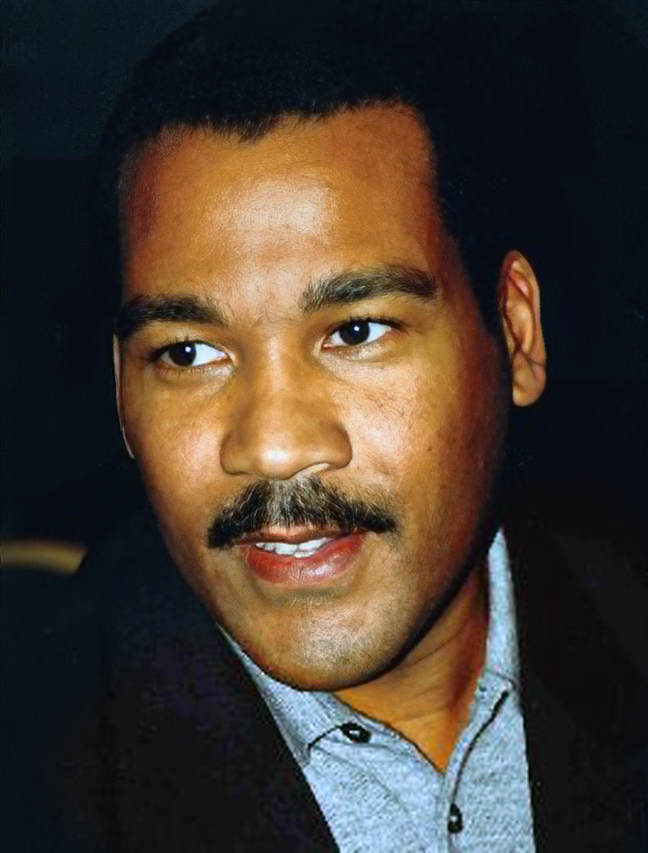
Dexter King

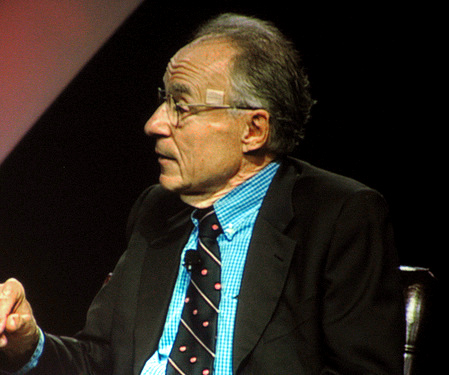
Arno Allan Penzias

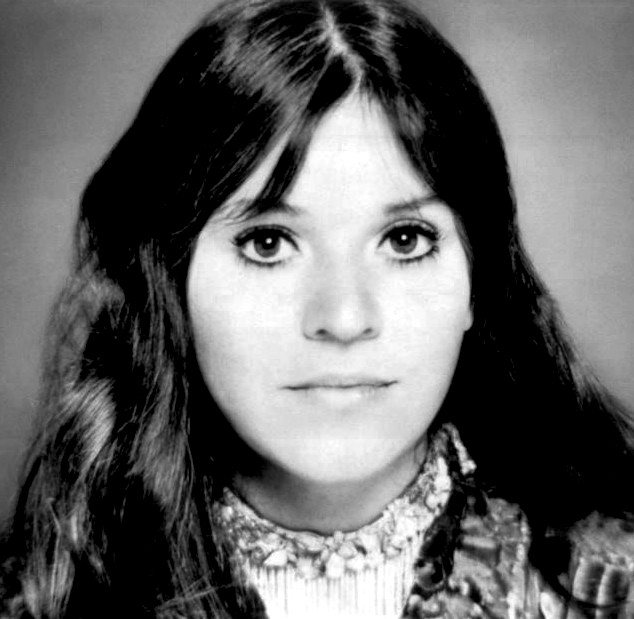
Melanie

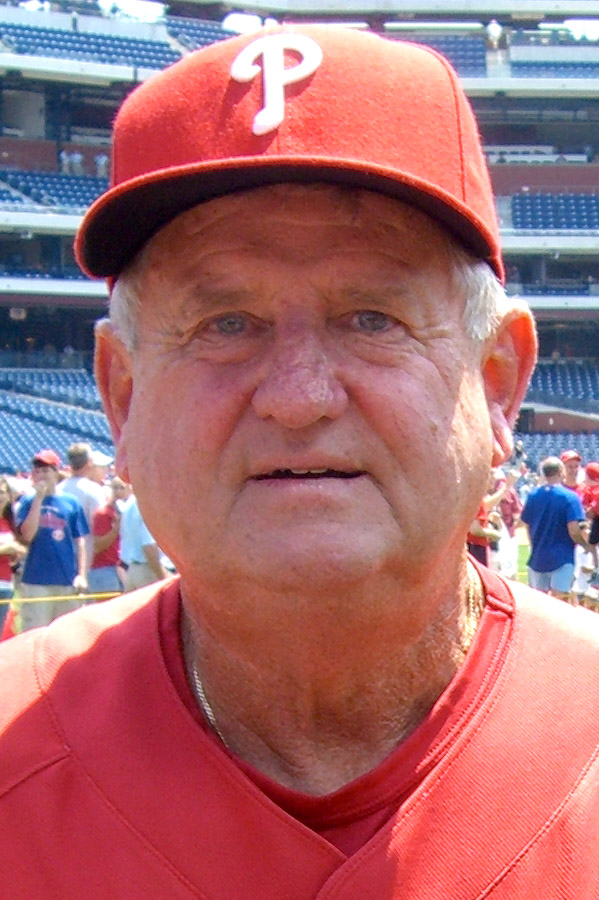
Jimy Williams

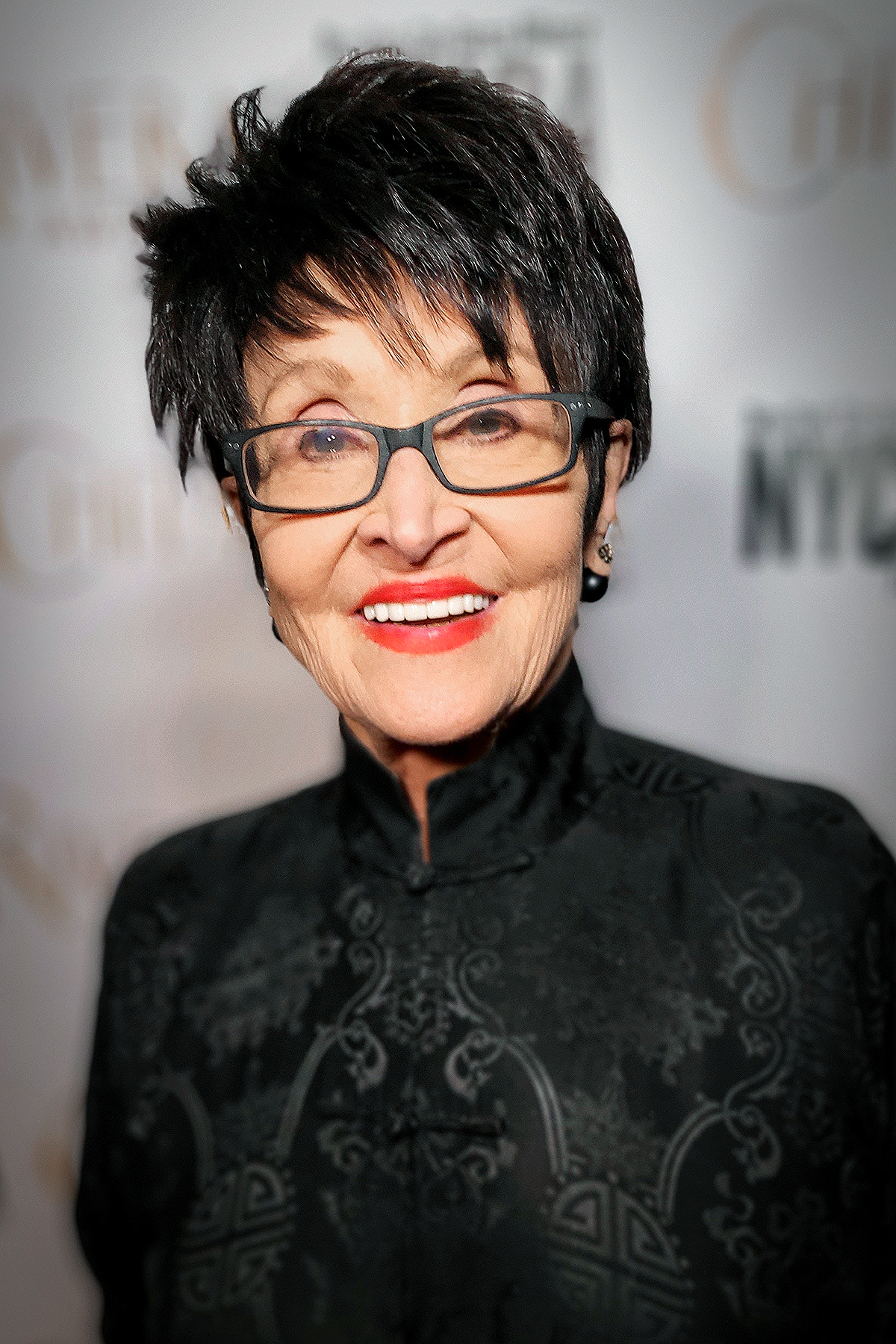
Chita Rivera

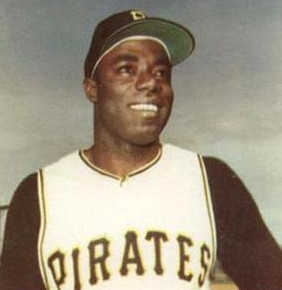
Al McBean

- January 1
  - Adaora Adimora, 67, doctor and academic (b. 1956)
  - Anthony J. Alvarado, 81, educator, New York City Schools Chancellor (1983–1984) (b. 1942)
  - Mickey Cottrell, 79, actor (My Own Private Idaho, Drugstore Cowboy, Volcano) and publicist (b. 1944)
  - J. Russell George, 60, attorney, treasury inspector general for tax administration (since 2004) (b. 1963)
  - Lynja, 67, internet personality (b. 1956)
  - Ved Prakash Nanda, India-born legal scholar
  - Jack O'Connell, 64, author (b. 1959)
  - Frank Ryan, 87, football player (Los Angeles Rams, Cleveland Browns, Washington Redskins) (b. 1936)
  - David J. Skal, 71, film historian and author (b. 1952)
  - Sidney M. Wolfe, 86, physician and health activist (b. 1937)
- January 2
  - Peter Berkos, 101, sound editor (Touch of Evil, The Hindenburg, The Sting) (b. 1922)
  - Edward E. Crutchfield, 82, banker (b. 1941)
  - Cameron Dunkin, 67, professional boxing manager (b. 1956)
  - David P. Gardner, 90, academic administrator, president of the University of Utah (1973–1983) and the University of California (1983–1992) (b. 1933)
  - Harry Johnson, 81, actor (Battlestar Galactica, Law & Order, Need for Speed) and author (b. 1942/1943)
  - E. Leo Milonas, 87, judge and lawyer, chief administrative judge of New York State (1993–1995) (b. 1936)
  - Matisyahu Salomon, 86, English-born rabbi (b. 1937)
  - Michael Schwartz, 86, academic administrator (b. 1937)
  - Alexis Smith, 74, visual artist (b. 1949)
  - Gordon R. Sullivan, 86, general, chief of staff of the Army (1991–1995) (b. 1937)
  - Richard Woodcock, 95, psychometrician. (b. 1928)
- January 3
  - Donald D. Clayton, 88, astrophysicist (b. 1935)
  - Bridget Dobson, 85, television writer (General Hospital, The Guiding Light) and producer (Santa Barbara) (b. 1938)
  - Billy Gardner, 96, baseball player (Baltimore Orioles) and manager (Minnesota Twins) (b. 1927)
  - Charles O. Jones, 92, political scientist (b. 1931)
  - Don Read, 90, football coach (Montana Grizzlies, Portland State Vikings, Oregon Ducks) (b. 1933)
  - Tawl Ross, 75, rhythm guitarist (Funkadelic) (b. 1948)
- January 4
  - Nancy Adler, 77, health psychologist (b. 1946)
  - Marty Amsler, 81, football player (Chicago Bears, Cincinnati Bengals, Green Bay Packers) (b. 1942)
  - John Scales Avery, 90, chemist and peace activist (b. 1933)
  - Fred Chappell, 87, author and poet (b. 1936)
  - Elliott D. Kieff, 80, virologist (b. 1943)
  - Frank Q. Nebeker, 93, jurist, judge of the District of Columbia Court of Appeals (1969–2021) and the U.S. Court of Appeals for Veterans Claims (1989–2021) (b. 1930)
  - David Soul, 80, actor (Starsky & Hutch, Here Come the Brides) and singer ("Don't Give Up on Us") (b. 1943)
  - Bill W. Stacy, 85, educator and university administrator, president of California State University San Marcos (1989–1997) and the University of Tennessee at Chattanooga (1997–2004) (b. 1938)
  - Tracy Tormé, 64, screenwriter (Fire in the Sky, Sliders, Star Trek: The Next Generation) and film producer (I Am Legend) (b. 1959)
- January 5
  - Willie Bethea, 85, football player (Hamilton Tiger-Cats) (b. 1938) (death announced on this date)
  - Larry Collins, 79, guitarist (The Collins Kids) and songwriter ("Delta Dawn") (b. 1944)
  - Gene Deer, 59, blues musician (b. 1964)
  - Mary Jane Garcia, 87, politician, member of the New Mexico Senate (1988–2012) (b. 1936)
  - Joachim Giermek, 80, Franciscan Father, minister general of the Conventuals (2002–2007) (b. 1943)
  - Joseph Lelyveld, 86, journalist (The New York Times) (b. 1937)
  - Harry Robert Lyall, 75, conductor and opera administrator (New Orleans Opera) (b. 1948)
  - Brian McConnachie, 81, actor and comedy writer (Saturday Night Live, Second City Television, National Lampoon) (b. 1942)
  - James N. Purcell Jr., 85, author (b. 1938)
  - Nicholas Rescher, 95, German-born philosopher, founder of American Philosophical Quarterly, History of Philosophy Quarterly and Public Affairs Quarterly (b. 1928)
  - Robert Rosenthal, 90, German-born psychologist (b. 1933)
  - Jack Squirek, 64, football player (Los Angeles Raiders) (b. 1959)
- January 6
  - Bob Gaiters, 85, football player (New York Giants, San Francisco 49ers, Denver Broncos) (b. 1938)
  - Claude Gilbert, 91, football coach (San Diego State Aztecs, San Jose State Spartans) (b. 1932)
  - Iasos, 76, Greek-born musician (b. 1947)
  - Sarah Rice, 68, actress (Sweeney Todd: The Demon Barber of Fleet Street, A Little Night Music, The Phantom of the Opera) (b. 1955)
  - Suzanne Smith, 75, politician from New Hampshire (b. 1948).
- January 7
  - Joan Acocella, 78, journalist and dance critic (The New Yorker) (b. 1945)
  - Paul Burkett, 67, economist (b. 1956)
  - Dwight Cook, 72, politician, member of the North Dakota Senate (1997–2020) (b. 1951)
  - Menachem Daum, 77, German-born documentary film-maker (A Life Apart: Hasidism in America, Hiding and Seeking) (b. 1946)
  - Rick Duckett, 66, basketball coach (Fayetteville State Broncos, Winston-Salem State Rams, Grambling State Tigers) (b. 1957)
  - John Pat Fanning, 89, politician and mortician, member of the West Virginia Senate (1996–2012) (b. 1934)
  - Wendell Harris, 83, football player (Baltimore Colts, New York Giants) (b. 1940)
  - Barton Jahncke, 84, sailor, Olympic champion (1968) (b. 1939)
  - William Edward Kettler, 101, archaeologist and Rotary International leader (b. 1922)
  - Tim Steele, 55, racing driver, ARCA Menards Series champion (1993, 1996, 1997) (b. 1968)
  - Arnold Taraborrelli, 92, choreographer (b. 1931)
- January 8
  - Antoinette Candia-Bailey, 49, academic administrator (b. 1974)
  - Joseph Esposito, 73, police officer and civil servant (b. 1950)
  - Dorothea Hooper, 91, politician, member of the New Hampshire House of Representatives (2010–2014).
  - Johanna Meehan, 67, philosopher and academic (b. 1956)
  - Phill Niblock, 90, composer, filmmaker and videographer (b. 1933)
  - Richard Rosenfeld, 75, criminologist (b. 1948)
  - J. B. Schneewind, 93, scholar (b. 1930)
  - Reggie Wells, 76, makeup artist (b. 1947)
  - Leon Wildes, 90, lawyer (b. 1933)
  - Raymond Zane, 84, politician, member of the New Jersey Senate (1974–2002) (b. 1939)
- January 9
  - Bernard Cecil Cohen, 97, political scientist and academic administrator, acting chancellor of University of Wisconsin–Madison (1987) (b. 1926)
  - Edward Jay Epstein, 88, investigative journalist and professor (b. 1935)
  - Amalija Knavs, 78, Slovenian-born textile pattern maker (b. 1945)
  - James Kottak, 61, drummer (Kingdom Come, Scorpions) (b. 1962)
  - Ira Reiss, 98, sociologist (b. 1925)
  - Elke Solomon, 80, interdisciplinary artist, curator, and educator (b. 1943)
- January 10
  - Audie Blaylock, 61, bluegrass singer and guitarist (b. 1962)
  - Terry Bisson, 81, science fiction author ("Bears Discover Fire", "They're Made Out of Meat") (b. 1942)
  - Peter Crombie, 71, actor (Seinfeld, Se7en, My Dog Skip) (b. 1952)
  - Tisa Farrow, 72, actress (Homer, Zombi 2, Antropophagus) (b. 1951)
  - Jennell Jaquays, 67, game designer (Dungeons & Dragons) and video game artist (Pac-Man, Donkey Kong) (b. 1956)
  - Conrad Palmisano, 75, stuntman (Batman Forever, Weekend at Bernie's, Rush Hour 2) (b. 1948)
  - Richard T. Schlosberg, 79, business leader (Corpus Christi Caller-Times, The Denver Post, Los Angeles Times) (b. 1944)
  - Tom Tait, 86, volleyball coach (b. 1937)
- January 11
  - Ruth Ashton Taylor, 101, television journalist (KCBS-TV) (b. 1922)
  - John Barnes Jr., 92, member of the New Hampshire General Court.
  - Ted Blunt, 80, politician, member (1985–2000) and president (2001–2009) of the Wilmington, Delaware City Council (b. 1943)
  - John V. Byrne, 95, marine geologist and academic, administrator of the National Oceanic and Atmospheric Administration (1981–1984) and president of Oregon State University (1984–1995) (b. 1928)
  - April Ferry, 91, costume designer (Maverick, Big Trouble in Little China, Rome) (b. 1932)
  - Bud Harrelson, 79, baseball player (New York Mets, Philadelphia Phillies, Texas Rangers) (b. 1944)
  - Lynne Marta, 78, actress (Joe Kidd, Footloose, Love, American Style) (b. 1945)
- January 12
  - Claire Waters Ferguson, 88, figure skating judge, president of the U.S. Figure Skating Association (1992–1995) (b. 1935)
  - Bill Hayes, 98, singer ("The Ballad of Davy Crockett") and actor (Days of Our Lives) (b. 1925)
  - James D. Hughes, 101, Air Force lieutenant general (b. 1922)
  - Francis F. Lee, 96, Chinese-born inventor, businessman and academic (b. 1927)
  - Gonzalo Lira, 55, writer and YouTuber (b. 1968)
  - Alec Musser, 50, actor (All My Children) and fitness model (b. 1973)
  - Sekou Odinga, 79, activist (b. 1944)
  - John Red Eagle, 75, politician, principal chief of the Osage Nation (2010–2014), assistant chief (2006–2010) (b. 1948)
  - Stan Shaver, 75, politician, member of the West Virginia House of Delegates (b. 1948)
- January 13
  - Larry E. Haines, 85, politician, member of the Maryland Senate (1991–2011) (b. 1938)
  - Joyce Randolph, 99, actress (The Honeymooners) (b. 1924)
  - Tom Shales, 79, television critic (The Washington Post), writer and Pulitzer winner (1988) (b. 1944)
  - Jo-El Sonnier, 77, singer-songwriter and accordionist, Grammy winner (2015) (b. 1946)
  - Joseph Zadroga, 76, 9/11 survivor advocate (b. 1947)
- January 14
  - Art Baker, 94, football coach (Furman Paladins, The Citadel Bulldogs, East Carolina Pirates) (b. 1929)
  - Brian Barczyk, 54, snake collector and YouTuber (b. 1969)
  - Jerry Coker, 91, jazz saxophonist (b. 1932)
  - Jerry Hilgenberg, 92, football player (Iowa Hawkeyes) (b. 1931)
  - Alan Jones, 83, Episcopal priest, dean of Grace Cathedral, San Francisco (1985–2009) (b. 1940)
  - Tom Purdom, 87, writer (Romance on Four Worlds) (b. 1936)
  - Norm Snead, 84, football player (Philadelphia Eagles, Minnesota Vikings, New York Giants) (b. 1939)
  - Howard Waldrop, 77, science fiction author (Them Bones, A Dozen Tough Jobs, The Texas-Israeli War: 1999) (b. 1946)
- January 15
  - Nancy Deloye Fitzroy, 96, engineer (b. 1927)
  - Mo Henry, 67, film negative cutter (Jaws, The Big Lebowski, The Matrix) (b. 1956/1957)
  - William O'Connell, 94, actor (Paint Your Wagon, High Plains Drifter, The Outlaw Josey Wales) (b. 1929)
  - Ronald Powell, 32, football player (New Orleans Saints, Seattle Seahawks) (b. 1991)
  - Brent Sikkema, 75, art dealer (b. 1948)
  - Ron Suster, 81, jurist and politician, member of the Ohio House of Representatives (1981–1995) (b. 1942)
- January 16
  - Zevulun Charlop, 94, rabbi (b. 1929)
  - Joseph Delahunty, 88, politician.
  - Claire Fagin, 97, nurse and academic administrator, interim president of the University of Pennsylvania (1993–1994) (b. 1926)
  - David Gail, 58, actor (Robin's Hoods, Savannah, Port Charles) (b. 1965) (death announced on this date)
  - Peter Schickele, 88, composer, musical educator and parodist (P. D. Q. Bach) (b. 1935)
- January 17
  - Shawn Barber, 29, Olympic pole vaulter (2016), world champion (2015) (b. 1994)
  - Al Cantello, 92, Olympic javelin thrower (1960) (b. 1931)
  - Leo Carlin, 86, businessman (Philadelphia Eagles) (b. 1937)
  - Adele Clarke, 78, sociologist (b. 1945)
  - Benedict Fitzgerald, 74, screenwriter (Wise Blood, The Passion of the Christ) (b. 1949)
  - Robert Gaylor, 93, military non-commissioned officer, chief master sergeant of the Air Force (1977–1979) (b. 1930)
  - David L. Mills, 85, computer scientist (Network Time Protocol) (b. 1938)
- January 18
  - Silent Servant, 46, techno DJ and producer (b. 1977)
  - The Soft Moon, 44, musician (b. 1979)
- January 19
  - Jack Burke Jr., 100, professional golfer (b. 1923)
  - Domenick DiCicco, 60, politician, member of the New Jersey General Assembly (2010–2012) (b. 1963)
  - Mario E. Dorsonville, 63, Colombian-born Roman Catholic prelate, auxiliary bishop of Washington (2015–2023) and bishop of Houma–Thibodaux (since 2023) (b. 1960)
  - ABilly S. Jones-Hennin, 81, LGBT rights activist (b. 1942)
  - Lance Larson, 83, swimmer, Olympic champion (1960) (b. 1940)
  - Marlena Shaw, 81, singer ("It's Better than Walking Out", "California Soul") (b. 1942)
  - Red Swanson, 87, baseball player (Pittsburgh Pirates) (b. 1936)
  - Mary Weiss, 75, pop singer (The Shangri-Las) (b. 1948)
  - Robert Whitman, 88, artist (b. 1935)
- January 20
  - Rudolph C. Cane, 89, politician, member of the Maryland House of Delegates (1999–2015) (b. 1934)
  - Francisco Ciatso, 48, professional wrestler (b. 1975)
  - Anne Edwards, 96, writer (b. 1927)
  - David Emge, 77, actor (Dawn of the Dead, Basket Case 2, Hellmaster) (b. 1946)
  - Bob Landsee, 59, football player (Philadelphia Eagles) and coach (Green Bay Blizzard) (b. 1964)
  - William Charles Lee, 85, jurist, judge of the U.S. District Court for Northern Indiana (since 1981) (b. 1938)
- January 21
  - Jon Franklin, 82, science journalist (The Baltimore Sun) (b. 1942)
  - Perry Friedman, 55, poker player (b. 1968)
  - Chuck Philips, 71, writer, journalist and Pulitzer winner (1999) (b. 1952)
  - Steve Staggs, 72, baseball player (Toronto Blue Jays, Oakland Athletics) (b. 1951)
  - Gus Wingfield, 97, banker and politician, Arkansas state treasurer (2003–2007) (b. 1926)
- January 22
  - Ted Bloecher, 94, ufologist (National Investigations Committee On Aerial Phenomena) and actor, co-founder of Civilian Saucer Intelligence (b. 1929)
  - Gary Graham, 73, actor (All the Right Moves, Alien Nation, Star Trek: Enterprise) (b. 1950)
  - Dexter King, 62, civil rights activist (b. 1961)
  - Don Lassetter, 90, baseball player (St. Louis Cardinals) (b. 1933)
  - Arno Allan Penzias, 90, physicist and radio astronomer, Nobel Prize laureate (1978) (b. 1933)
  - Margo Smith, 84, singer ("Still a Woman") (b. 1939)
- January 23
  - Charles Fried, 88, jurist and lawyer, solicitor general (1985–1989) and associate justice of the Massachusetts Supreme Judicial Court (1995–1999) (b. 1935)
  - Ice Train, 56, professional wrestler (CWA, WCW) (b. 1967)
  - David Kahn, 93, historian, journalist, and writer (b. 1930)
  - Melanie, 76, singer-songwriter ("Brand New Key", "Lay Down (Candles in the Rain)") and guitarist (b. 1947)
  - Rene Oliveira, 68, politician, member of the Texas House of Representatives (1981–2019) (b. 1955)
  - Charles Osgood, 91, journalist (CBS News Sunday Morning) (b. 1933)
  - Margaret Riley, 58, film producer (Bombshell) (b. 1965)
  - Dick Traum, 83, marathoner and businessman (b. 1940)
- January 24
  - Carl Andre, 88, sculptor (b. 1935)
  - Frank Buck, 80, politician, member of the Tennessee House of Representatives (1973–2009) (b. 1944)
  - Harry Connick Sr., 97, attorney, district attorney of New Orleans (1973–2003) (b. 1926)
  - Herbert Coward, 85, actor (Deliverance) (b. 1935)
  - Howard Golden, 98, lawyer and politician, borough president of Brooklyn (1977–2001) (b. 1925)
  - Rod Holcomb, 80, television director (ER, The Greatest American Hero) and producer (The Six Million Dollar Man), Emmy winner (2009) (b. 1943)
  - Jesse Jane, 43, pornographic actress (Pirates, Pirates II: Stagnetti's Revenge) and host (Naughty Amateur Home Videos) (b. 1980) (body discovered on this date)
  - Kelly Malveaux, 47, football player (Winnipeg Blue Bombers, Calgary Stampeders, Montreal Alouettes) (b. 1976)
  - N. Scott Momaday, 89, author (House Made of Dawn, The Way to Rainy Mountain, The Man Made of Words: Essays, Stories, Passages).
  - Cheryl Palm, 70, agriculturalist (b. 1954)
- January 25
  - Bené Arnold, 88, ballerina (b. 1935)
  - Conrad Chase, 58, actor, singer and reality TV contestant (Gran Hermano) (b. 1965) (death announced on this date)
  - Roger Donlon, 89, army officer, Medal of Honor recipient (1964) (b. 1934)
  - Amanda Hanson, 38, American journalist, surgery complications (b. 1985).
  - Gus Hendrickson, 83, ice hockey player and coach (University of Minnesota Duluth) (b. 1940)
  - Kenneth Smith, 58, convicted murderer (b. 1965)
- January 26
  - Dean Brown, 68, jazz guitarist (b. 1955)
  - John Hines, 87, rancher and politician (b. 1936)
  - Michael Watford, 80, dance music singer (b. 1943/44)
  - Jimy Williams, 80, baseball player (St. Louis Cardinals) and manager (Boston Red Sox, Toronto Blue Jays).
- January 27
  - Paul Vallone, 56, politician, member of the New York City Council (2014–2021) (b. 1967)
  - L. W. Wright, 74, confidence trickster (b. 1949)
- January 28
  - Irma Anderson, 93, politician, mayor of Richmond, California (2001–2006) (b. 1931)
  - Barbara Jean Burns, 82, American academic (b. 1941).
  - Larry L. Taylor, 81, military officer, Medal of Honor recipient (b. 1942)
- January 29
  - Hal Buell, 92, photographer (b. 1931/1932)
  - Anthony Cordesman, 84, national security analyst (b. 1939)
  - Jim Sebesta, 88, politician, member of the Florida Senate (1999–2006) (b. 1935)
- January 30
  - Hinton Battle, 67, actor (Chicago, Ragtime, The Wiz) (b. 1956)
  - Jean Carnahan, 90, politician, member of the U.S. Senate (2001–2002), First Lady of Missouri (1993–2000) (b. 1933)
  - Melinda Ledbetter, 77, talent manager (b. 1946)
  - Chita Rivera, 91, actress (West Side Story, Kiss of the Spider Woman, Chicago) (b. 1933)
  - Richard H. Smith, 78, politician, member of the Georgia House of Representatives (since 2005) (b. 1945)
- January 31
  - Stan Aronoff, 91, politician, president of the Ohio Senate (1989–1996) (b. 1932)
  - Terry Beasley, 73, football player (San Francisco 49ers) (b. 1950)
  - Joe Madison, 74, radio talk-show host (SiriusXM Urban View, WOL-AM) and activist (b. 1949)
  - Al McBean, 85, baseball player (Pittsburgh Pirates, Los Angeles Dodgers, San Diego Padres) (b. 1938)
  - John Pregenzer, 91, baseball player (San Francisco Giants) (b. 1932)

== February ==
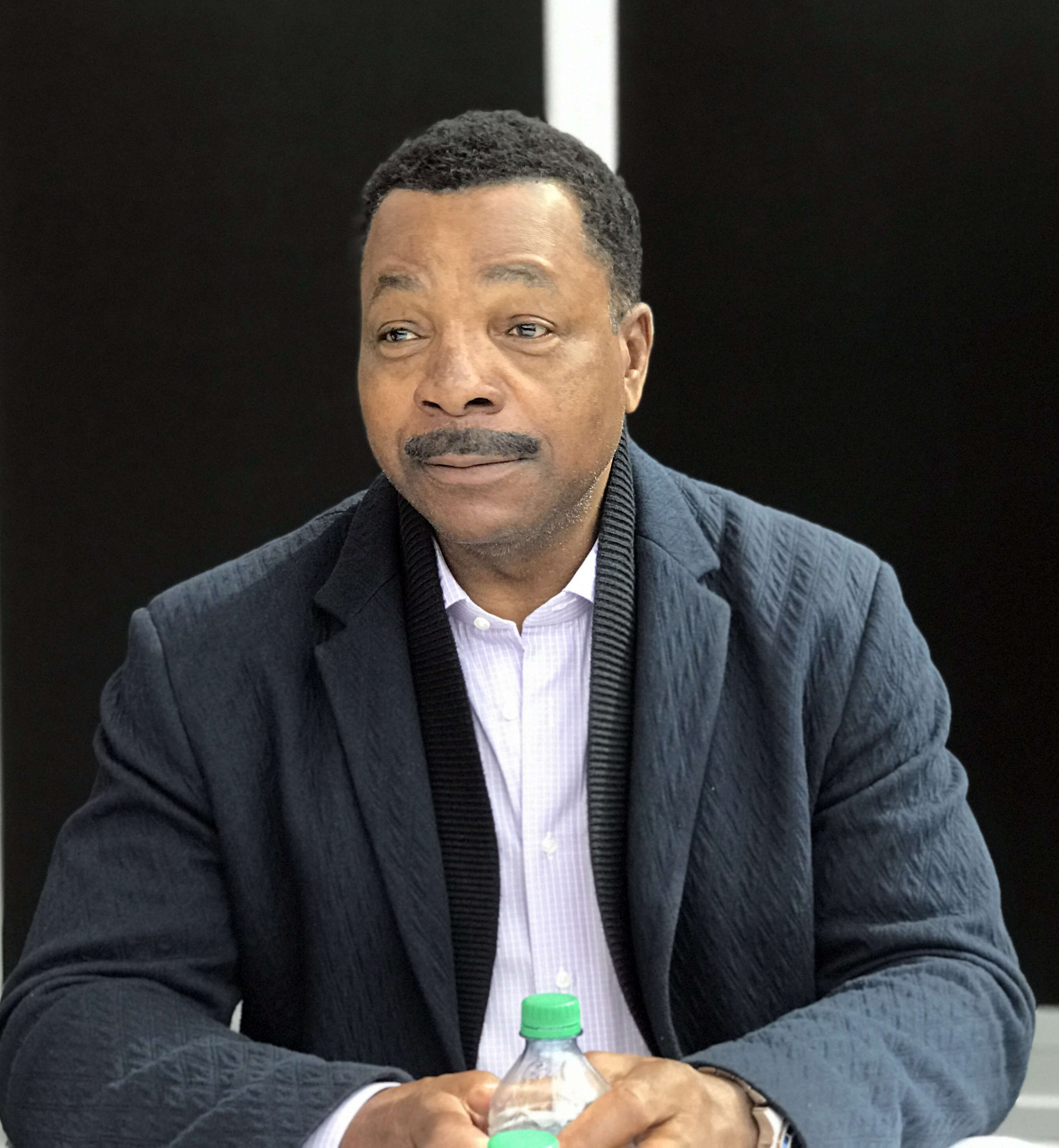
Carl Weathers

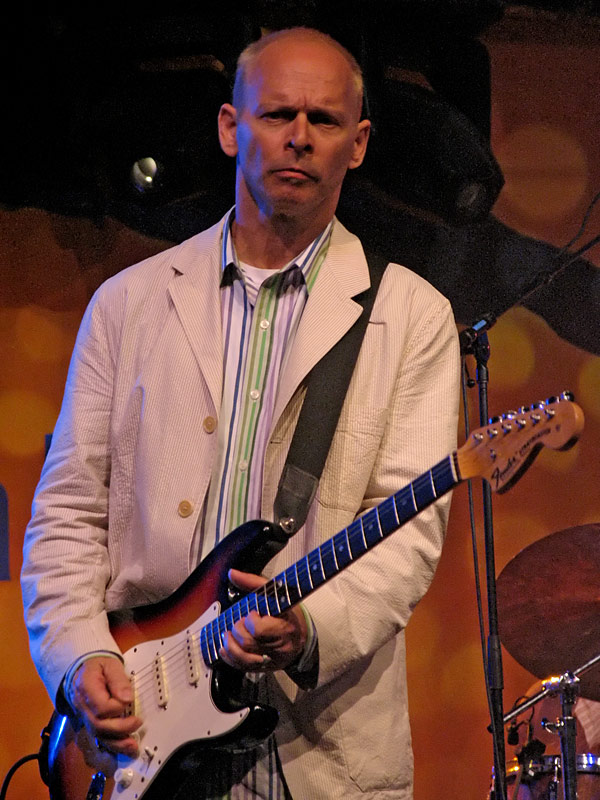
Wayne Kramer

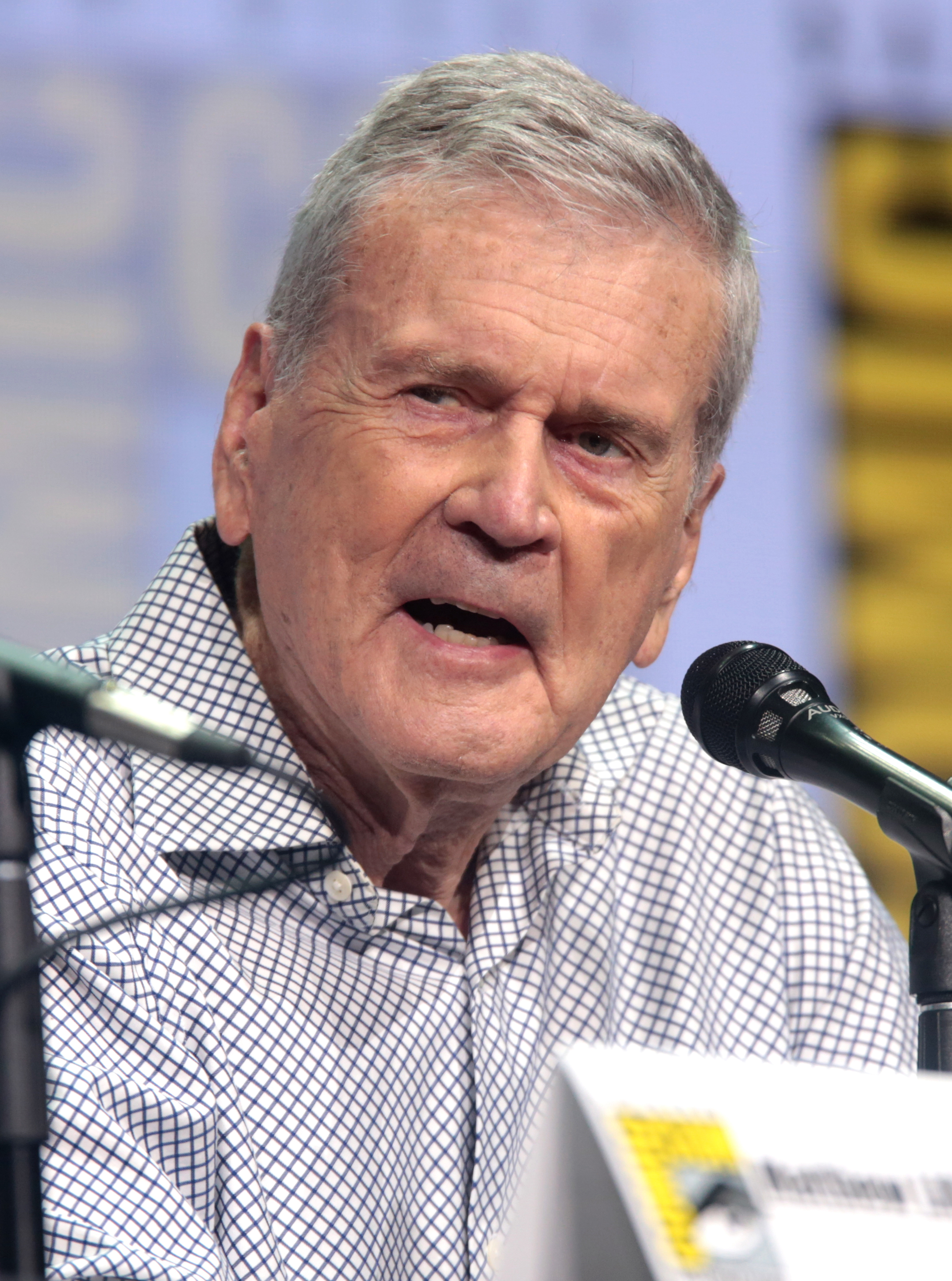
Don Murray

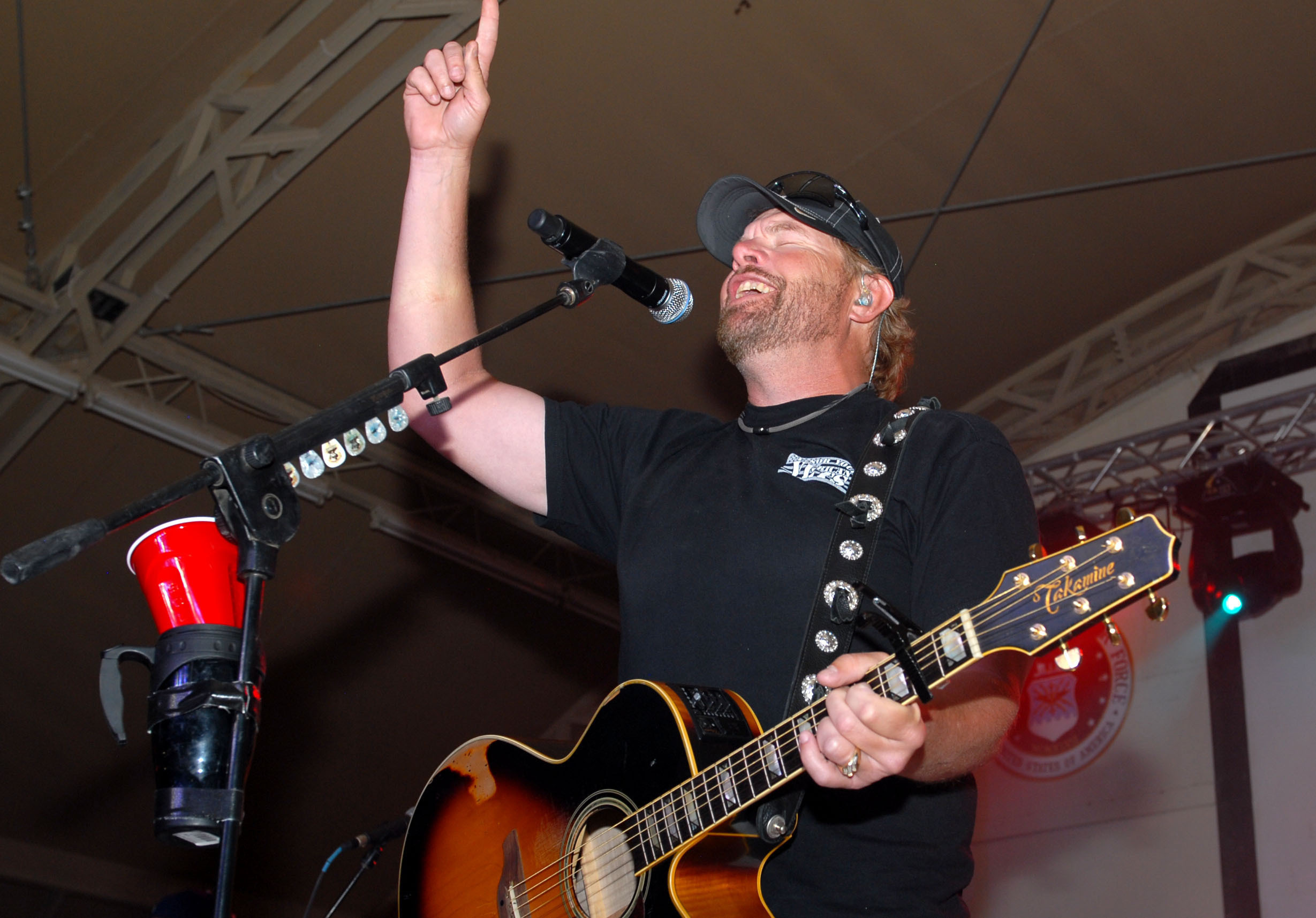
Toby Keith

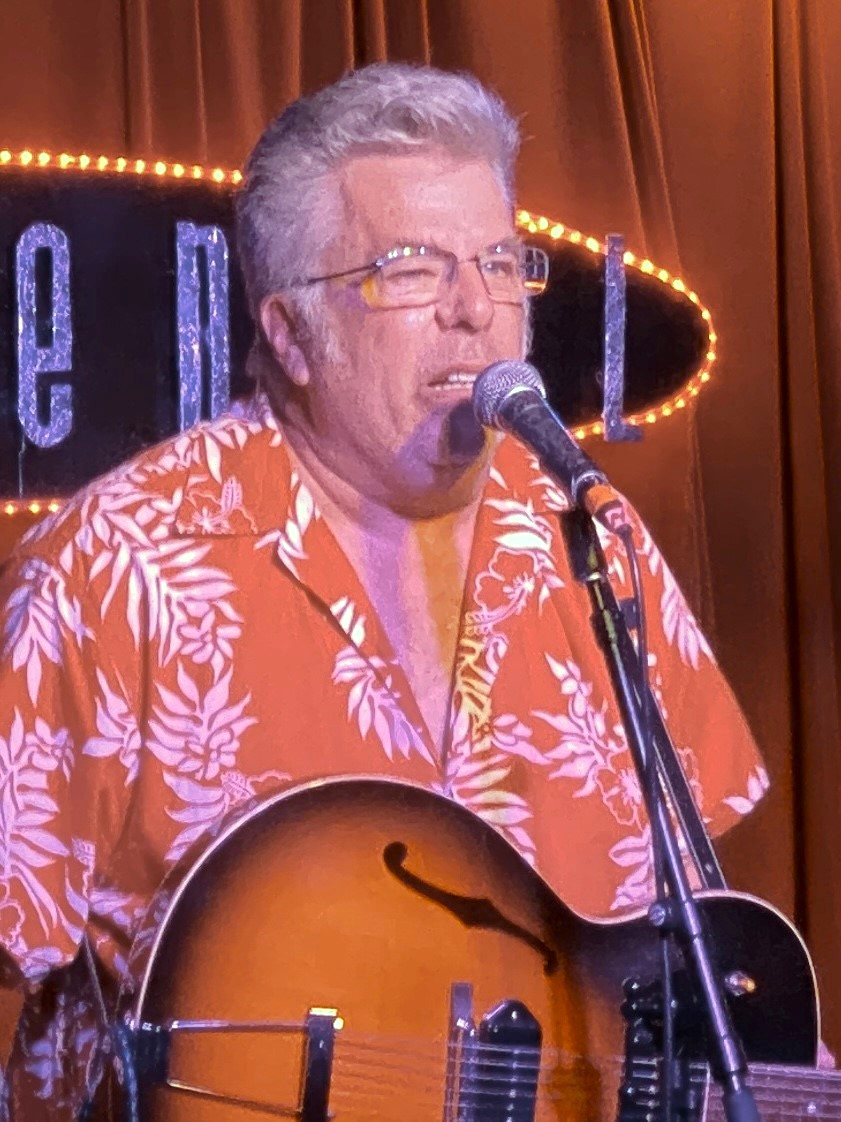
Mojo Nixon

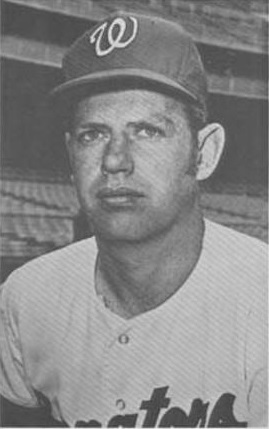
Jim Hannan

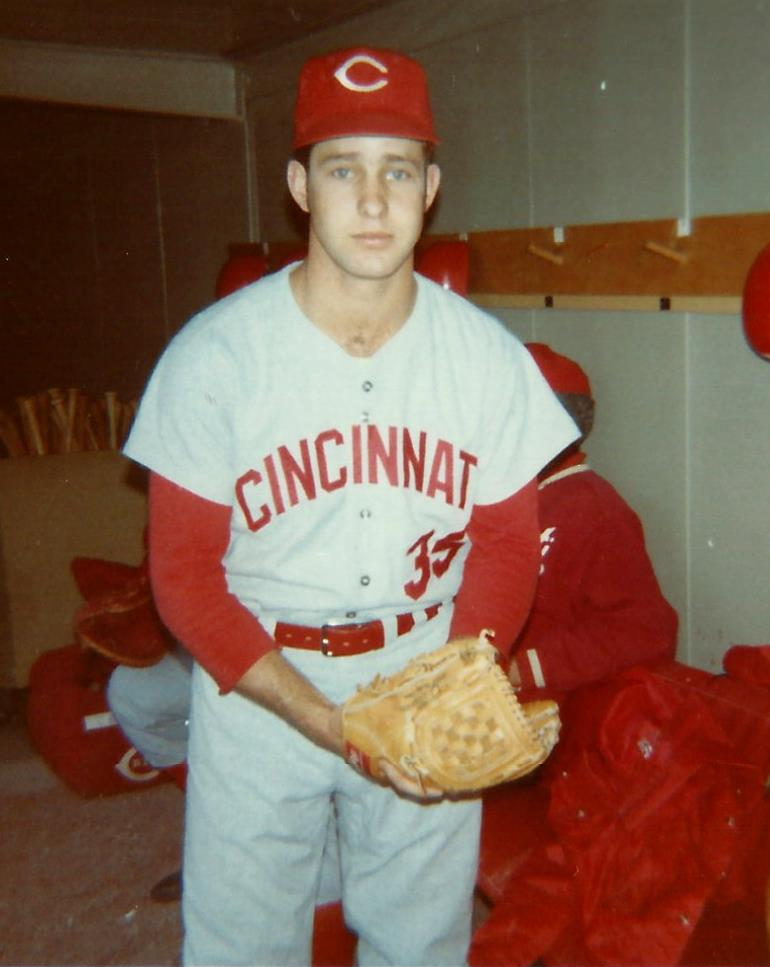
Don Gullett

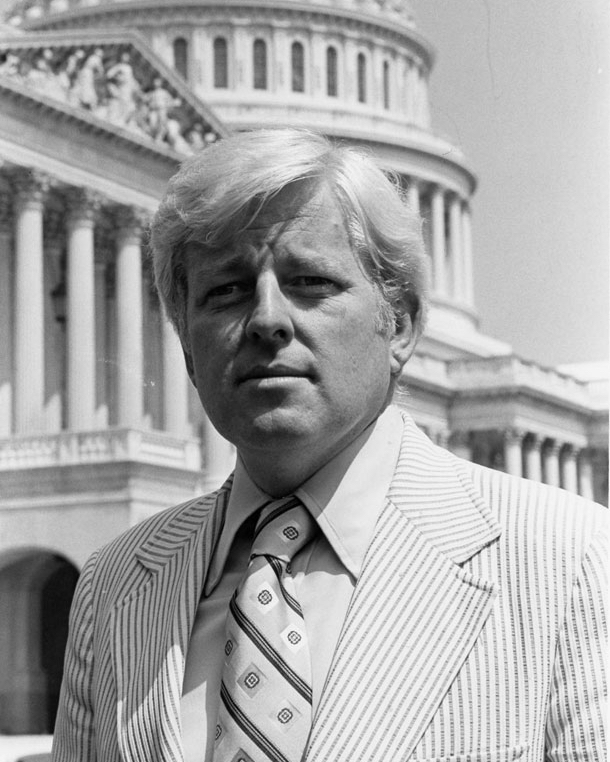
Charles D. Ferris

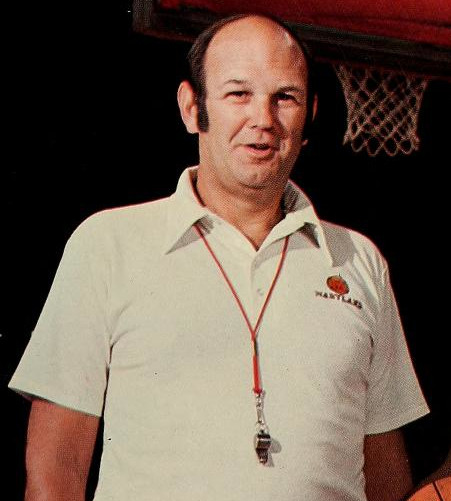
Lefty Driesell

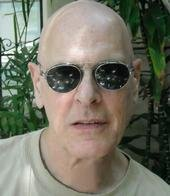
David Libert

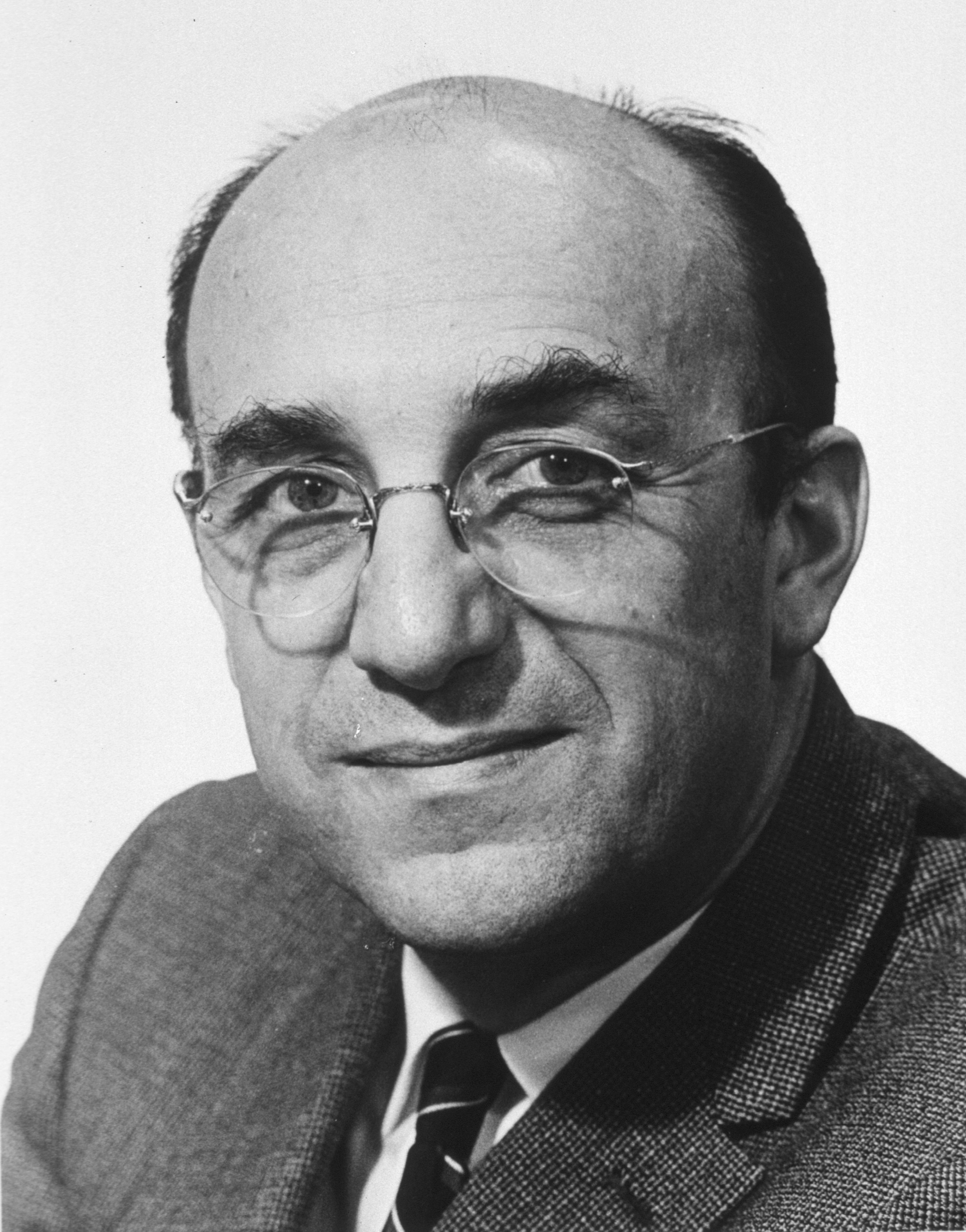
Roger Guillemin

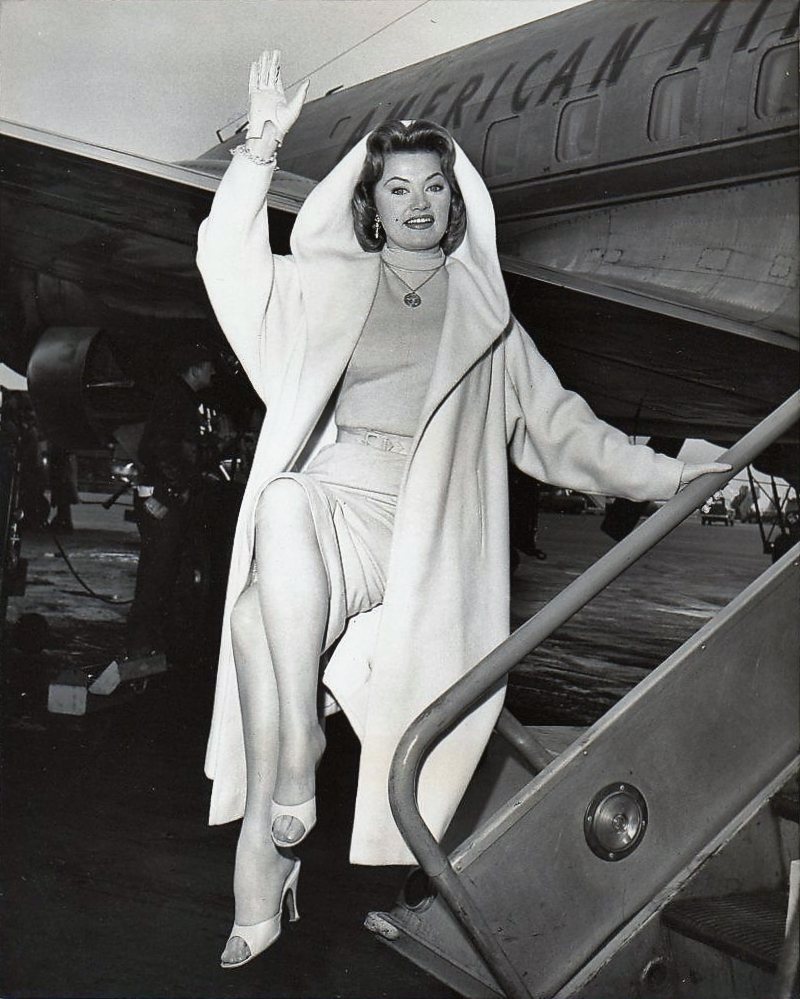
Jackie Loughery

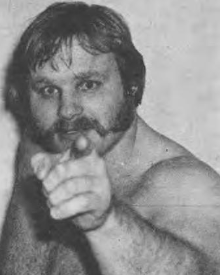
Ole Anderson

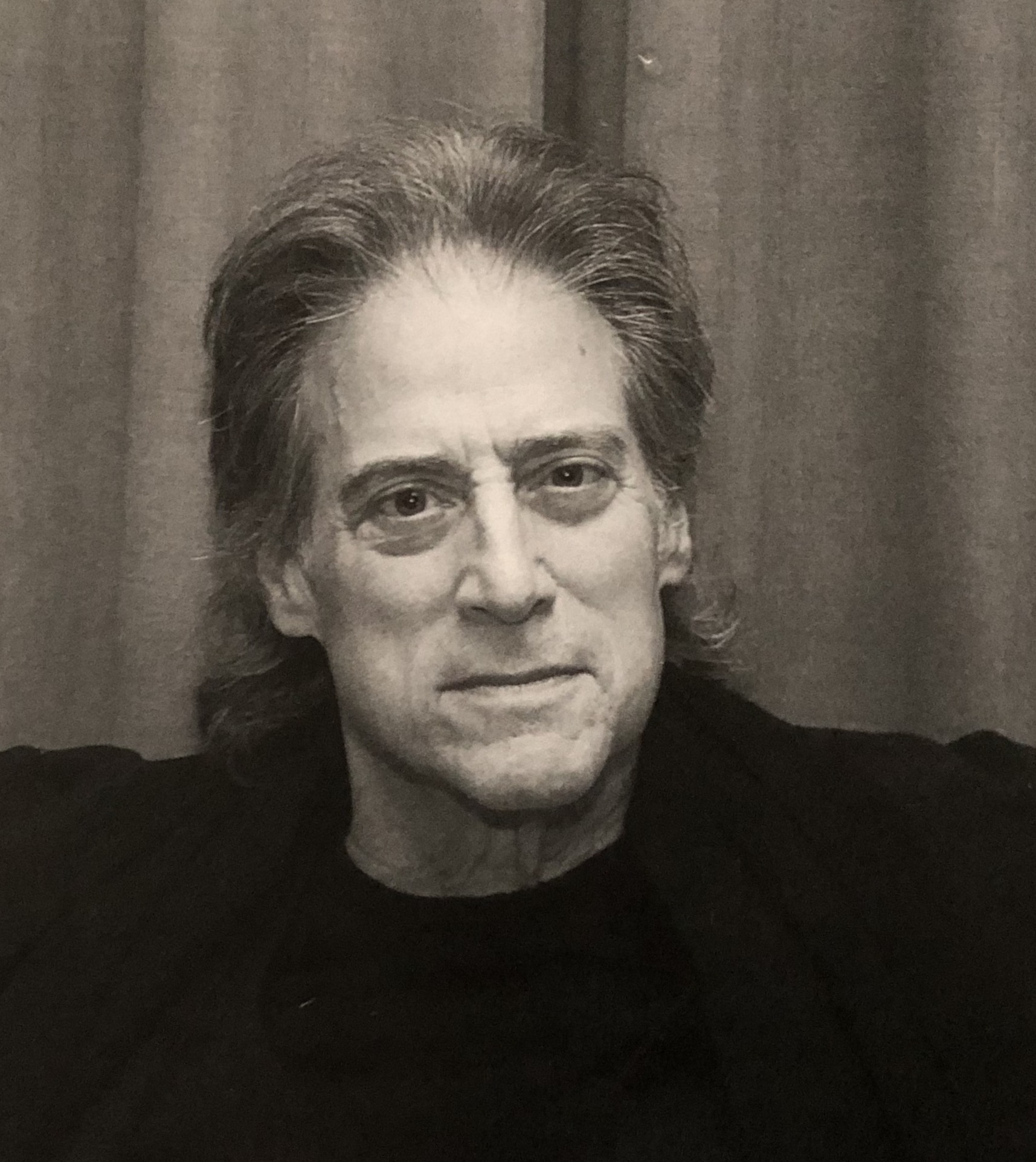
Richard Lewis

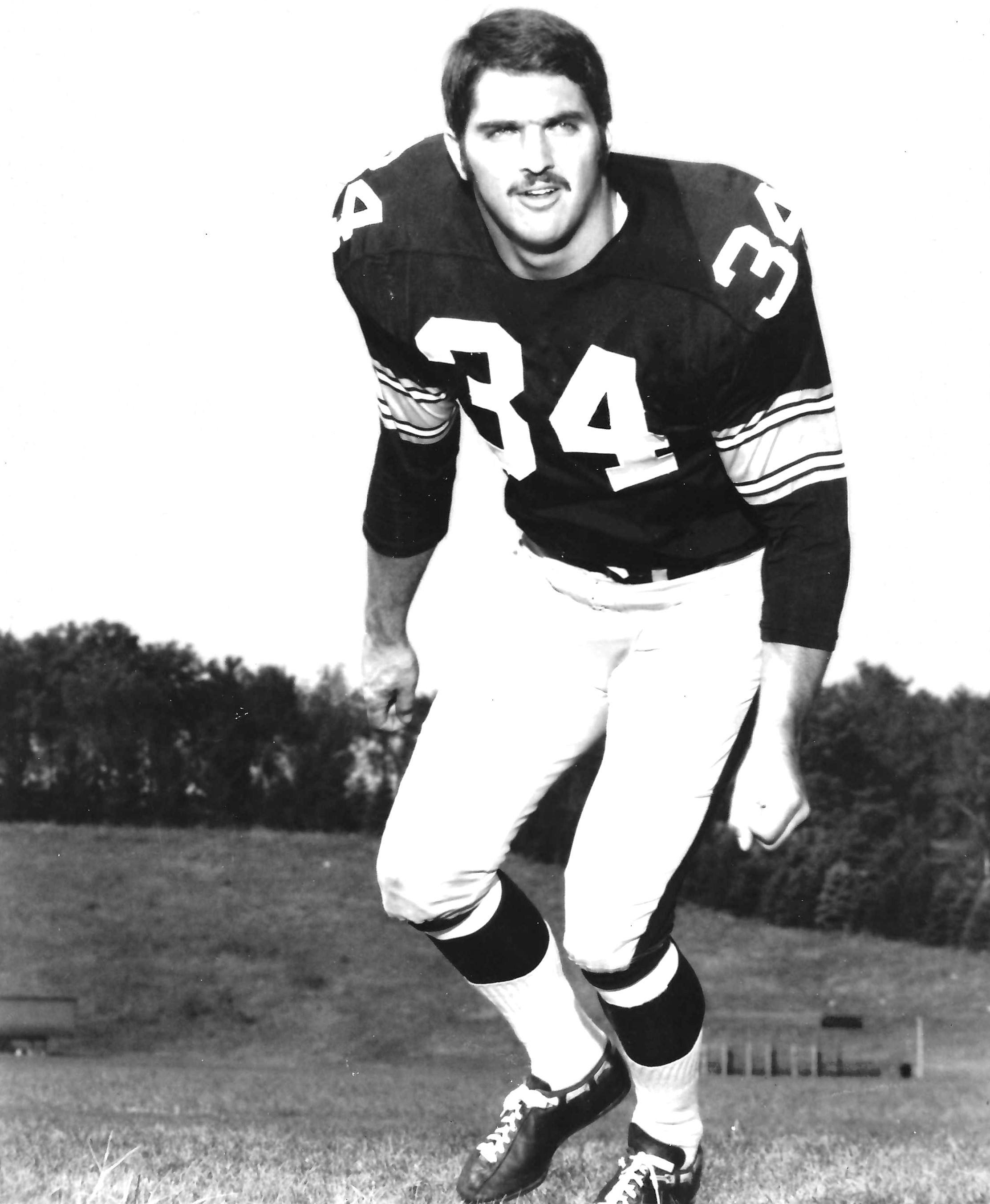
Andy Russell

- February 1
  - Pearl Berg, 114, supercentenarian (b. 1909)
  - Mark Gustafson, 63, film and television director and animator (Claymation Easter, Fantastic Mr. Fox, Guillermo del Toro's Pinocchio) (b. 1960)
  - Wilburn Hollis, 83, football player (Iowa Hawkeyes) (b. 1940)
  - Alonzo Johnson, 60, football player (Florida Gators, Philadelphia Eagles) (b. 1963)
  - Grace Joncas, 100, politician, member of the New Hampshire House of Representatives (b. 1923)
  - Mike Martin, 79, Hall of Fame college baseball coach (Florida State Seminoles) (b. 1944)
  - Carl Weathers, 76, actor (Rocky, Predator, Happy Gilmore) and football player (Oakland Raiders) (b. 1948)
- February 2
  - Rich Caster, 75, football player (New York Jets, Houston Oilers, New Orleans Saints) (b. 1948)
  - Wilhelmenia Fernandez, 75, soprano (b. 1949)
  - H. E. Francis, 100, scholar, academic and writer (b. 1924)
  - Wayne Kramer, 75, guitarist (MC5) (b. 1948)
  - Don Murray, 94, actor (Bus Stop, Baby the Rain Must Fall, Conquest of the Planet of the Apes) (b. 1929)
  - Rod Rosenbladt, 82, Lutheran theologian and academic (Concordia University Irvine) (b. 1942)
  - Jim Rowinski, 63, basketball player (Purdue Boilermakers, Detroit Pistons, Philadelphia 76ers) (b. 1961)
- February 3
  - Bill Carr, 78, football player, coach and executive (Florida Gators) (b. 1945)
  - Bruce DeMars, 88, admiral (b. 1935)
  - Arthur M. Gignilliat Jr., 91, politician, member of the Georgia House of Representatives (1966–1980) (b. 1932)
  - Bill Lachemann, 89, baseball coach (Los Angeles Angels) (b. 1934)
  - Keith King, 75, politician, member of the Colorado House of Representatives (1999–2007) and Senate (2009–2013) (b. 1948)
- February 4
  - Brant Alyea, 83, baseball player (Washington Senators, Minnesota Twins, Oakland Athletics) (b. 1940)
  - Bob Beckwith, 91, firefighter (September 11 rescue efforts) (b. 1932)
  - Joel Belz, 82, magazine publisher, founder of World (b. 1941)
  - Earl Cureton, 66, basketball player (Philadelphia 76ers, Detroit Pistons, Houston Rockets) (b. 1957)
  - Alice Darr, 93, American musician (b. 1930).
  - Brooke Ellison, 45, academic and disability advocate (b. 1978)
  - Martin Kirkup, 75, British-born music industry executive (b. 1948)
  - Peter Villano, 100, politician, member of the Connecticut House of Representatives (1993–2013) (b. 1924)
  - Melvin Way, 70, folk artist (b. 1954)
- February 5
  - William Current, 89, politician, member of the North Carolina House of Representatives (2005–2013)
  - Mickey Gilbert, 87, actor, rodeo performer and stuntman (Butch Cassidy and the Sundance Kid, Blazing Saddles, The Frisco Kid) (b. 1936)
  - Toby Keith, 62, country singer ("Should've Been a Cowboy", "How Do You Like Me Now?!", "Who's That Man"), songwriter and record producer (b. 1962)
  - Laralyn McWilliams, 58, video game designer (b. 1965)
  - Bill Northey, 64, politician, Iowa secretary of agriculture (2007–2018) (b. 1959) (death announced on this date)
- February 6
  - Ken Fritz, 66, football player (Ohio State Buckeyes) (b. 1957)
  - Cecilia Gentili, 52, Argentine-born actress (Pose) and LGBTQ activist (b. 1972)
  - Jack M. Guttentag, 100, banker and academic (b. 1923)
  - Donald Kinsey, 70, guitarist and singer (b. 1953)
  - Rod Sherman, 79, football player (Oakland Raiders, Cincinnati Bengals, Denver Broncos) (b. 1944)
  - Robert M. Young, 99, film director (Alambrista!, The Ballad of Gregorio Cortez, Saving Grace) (b. 1924)
- February 7
  - Henry Fambrough, 85, Hall of Fame singer (The Spinners) (b. 1938)
  - Carl Iwasaki, 62, baseball coach (Austin Kangaroos, Northern Colorado Bears) (b. 1961)
  - Mojo Nixon, 66, musician ("Debbie Gibson Is Pregnant with My Two-Headed Love Child") and actor (Super Mario Bros., Great Balls of Fire!) (b. 1957)
- February 8
  - Virginia Beavert, 102, Ichiskin linguist (b. 1921)
  - Joe Dudley, 86, businessman and hair care entrepreneur (b. 1937)
- February 9
  - Jim Hannan, 84, baseball player (Washington Senators) and executive, founder, president, and chairman of the board for the MLBPAA (b. 1940) (death announced on this date)
  - Lenny Simpson, 75, tennis player (b. 1948)
  - Ed Tarver, 64, lawyer and politician, member of the Georgia State Senate (2005–2009) and U.S. attorney for the Southern District of Georgia (2009–2017) (b. 1959)
  - Jimmy Van Eaton, 86, rock drummer, singer and record producer (b. 1937)
- February 10
  - Bob Edwards, 76, radio journalist (All Things Considered, Morning Edition) (b. 1947)
  - Chris Markoff, 84, Yugoslav-born professional wrestler (b. 1940)
  - William Post, 96, businessman and inventor (Pop-Tarts) (b. 1927)
  - E. Duke Vincent, 91, television producer (Beverly Hills, 90210, Charmed, 7th Heaven) (b. 1932)
  - Onzlee Ware, 70, politician and judge, member of the Virginia House of Delegates (2004–2014) (b. 1954)
- February 11
  - Angela Chao, 50, businesswoman and CEO of Foremost Group (b. 1973)
  - Randy Sparks, 90, singer-songwriter (The New Christy Minstrels, The Back Porch Majority) (b. 1933)
- February 12
  - David Bouley, 70, chef (b. 1953)
  - Chuck Mawhinney, 75, Marine officer (b. 1949)
  - Sam Mercer, 69, film producer (The Sixth Sense, Unbreakable, Signs) (b. 1954)
- February 13
  - Eddie Cheeba, 67, disc jockey (b. 1956)
  - Ken Ploen, 88, Hall of Fame football player (Winnipeg Blue Bombers) (b. 1935)
  - Kasha Rigby, 54, competitive skier and pioneer of telemark skiing (b. 1970)
- February 14
  - Don Gullett, 73, baseball player (Cincinnati Reds, New York Yankees) (b. 1951)
  - Ferenc Pavlics, 96, Hungarian-born mechanical engineer (b. 1928)
  - Lena Prewitt, 92, academic (b. 1931)
  - Dan Wilcox, 82, television producer and screenwriter (M*A*S*H) (b. 1941)
- February 15
  - Kagney Linn Karter, 36, pornographic actress (b. 1987)
  - Fulton Kuykendall, 70, football player (Atlanta Falcons) (b. 1953)
  - Tom Qualters, 88, baseball player (Philadelphia Phillies, Chicago White Sox) (b. 1935)
  - Anne Whitfield, 85, actress (Show Boat, White Christmas, Juvenile Jungle) (b. 1938)
  - Steven M. Wise, 73, author and legal scholar (b. 1950)
- February 16
  - Etterlene DeBarge, 88, singer (b. 1935)
  - Charles D. Ferris, 90, lawyer and government official, chairman of the Federal Communications Commission (1977–1981) (b. 1933)
  - Joe Hindelang, 78, college baseball coach (USciences Devils, Lafayette Leopards, Penn State Nittany Lions) (b. 1945)
  - Reuben Jackson, 67, poet and jazz historian (b. 1956)
  - Ben Lanzarone, 85, composer (Happy Days, Dynasty, Mr. Belvedere) (b. 1938)
  - Dexter Romweber, 57, musician (Flat Duo Jets) (b. 1966)
  - Cynthia Strother, 88, singer (The Bell Sisters) (b. 1935)
  - Welcome W. Wilson Sr., 95, real estate executive (b. 1928)
- February 17
  - Mary Bartlett Bunge, 92, neuroscientist (b. 1931)
  - Lefty Driesell, 92, Hall of Fame basketball coach (Davidson Wildcats, Maryland Terrapins, James Madison Dukes) (b. 1931)
  - Peter Michael Muhich, 62, Roman Catholic prelate, bishop of Rapid City (since 2020) (b. 1961)
  - Marc Pachter, 80, museum director (National Portrait Gallery, National Museum of American History) (b. 1943)
- February 18
  - Jack Biddle, 94, politician, member of the Alabama House of Representatives (1974–1994) and the Senate (1994–2006) (b. 1930)
  - Tony Ganios, 64, actor (The Wanderers, Porky's, Die Hard 2) (b. 1959)
  - Michael Grunstein, 77, Romanian-born biologist and academic (b. 1946)
  - Bobbie Wygant, 97, reporter and talk show host (KXAS-TV) (b. 1926)
  - Lanny Flaherty, 81, actor (Miller's Crossing, Signs, Men in Black 3) (b. 1942) (death announced on this date)
- February 19
  - Paul D'Amato, 75, actor (Slap Shot, The Deer Hunter, Heaven's Gate) (b. 1948)
  - Matt Sweeney, 75, special effects artist (Lethal Weapon, Apollo 13, Fast & Furious) (b. 1948)
  - Robert Reid, 68, basketball player (Houston Rockets, Charlotte Hornets, Portland Trail Blazers) and coach (b. 1955)
- February 20
  - Hydeia Broadbent, 39, HIV/AIDS activist (b. 1984)
  - Ron Cameron, 79, sportscaster (b. 1945)
  - David Libert, 81, music executive, musician (The Happenings) and author (b. 1943)
  - Steve Miller, 73, science fiction author (Liaden universe) (b. 1950)
- February 21
  - John Bahnsen, 89, brigadier general (b. 1934)
  - Mike Cherry, 81, politician, member of the Kentucky House of Representatives (1998–2013) (b. 1943)
  - Roger Guillemin, 100, French-born neuroscientist, Nobel Prize laureate (1977) (b. 1924)
  - Kent Kramer, 79, football player (Philadelphia Eagles, Minnesota Vikings, New Orleans Saints) (b. 1944)
  - Vitalij Kuprij, 49, Ukrainian-born musician (Trans-Siberian Orchestra, Ring of Fire) and composer (b. 1974)
  - Frank Lombardo, 65, politician, member of the Rhode Island Senate (since 2011) (b. 1958)
  - Steve Paxton, 85, experimental dancer and choreographer.
- February 22
  - Robert Booker, 88, politician and activist, member of the Tennessee House of Representatives (1967–1972) (b. 1935)
  - Edith Ceccarelli, 116, supercentenarian (b. 1908)
  - Kent Melton, 68, animation sculptor (The Lion King, The Incredibles, Aladdin) (b. 1955)
  - Roni Stoneman, 85, country musician (Hee Haw) (b. 1938)
- February 23
  - Flaco, 13, owl (b. 2010)
  - Lynda Gravátt, 76, actress (Intimate Apparel, Doubt: A Parable, 45 Seconds from Broadway) (b. 1947)
  - Jackie Loughery, 93, actress (The D.I.) and beauty pageant holder (Miss USA 1952) (b. 1930)
  - Golden Richards, 73, football player (Dallas Cowboys, Chicago Bears, Denver Broncos), Super Bowl champion (1978) (b. 1950)
  - Drucilla Roberts Bickford, 98, politician, member of the New Hampshire House of Representatives (b. 1925).
- February 24
  - Jay Cimino, 87, automotive industry executive (b. 1936)
  - John Farber, 98, Romanian-born businessman and billionaire (b. 1925)
  - Ramona Fradon, 97, comic book artist (Adventure Comics, Brenda Starr, Reporter) (b. 1926)
  - Lyn Hejinian, 82, poet, essayist, and translator (b. 1941)
  - Eric Mays, 65, politician, member of the Flint City Council (since 2014) (b. 1958)
  - John Oldham, 91, baseball player (Cincinnati Redlegs) (b. 1932)
- February 25
  - Aaron Bushnell, 25, military serviceman (b. 1998/1999)
  - Charles Dierkop, 87, actor (Butch Cassidy and the Sundance Kid, The Sting, Police Woman) (b. 1936)
  - Morris Eaves, 79, scholar (b. 1944)
  - Benjamin Miller, 87, judge, justice of the Illinois Supreme Court (1984–2001) (b. 1935)
  - Steve Okoniewski, 74, football player (Green Bay Packers, Buffalo Bills, St. Louis Cardinals) (b. 1949)
  - Frank Popoff, 88, Bulgarian-born businessman (Dow Chemical Company, TCF Financial Corporation) (b. 1935)
- February 26
  - Ole Anderson, 81, professional wrestler (World Championship Wrestling, Pro Wrestling USA) (b. 1942)
  - Craig Roh, 33, football player (BC Lions, Winnipeg Blue Bombers, Toronto Argonauts) (b. 1991)
- February 27
  - Robert Leon Jordan, 89, jurist, judge of the U.S. District Court for Eastern Tennessee (since 1988) (b. 1934)
  - Richard Lewis, 76, comedian and actor (Curb Your Enthusiasm, Anything but Love, Robin Hood: Men in Tights) (b. 1947)
  - Dale Messer, 86, football player (San Francisco 49ers) (b. 1937)
  - Richard H. Truly, 86, astronaut, Administrator of NASA (1989–1992) (b. 1937)
- February 28
  - Frank Haig, 95, Jesuit priest, physicist and academic administrator (b. 1928)
  - Bob Heil, 83, sound and radio engineer (b. 1940)
  - Eugen Indjic, 76, French-born pianist (b. 1947)
  - Cat Janice, 31, singer-songwriter (b. 1993)
  - Héctor Ortiz, 54, Puerto Rican baseball player (Kansas City Royals) and coach (Texas Rangers) (b. 1969)
  - Virgil, 61, professional wrestler (b. 1962)
- February 29
  - David Bordwell, 76, film theorist and film historian (b. 1947)
  - Betty Holzendorf, 84, politician, member of the Florida Senate (1992–2002) and House of Representatives (1988–1992) (b. 1939)
  - Andy Russell, 82, football player (Pittsburgh Steelers) (b. 1941)

== March ==
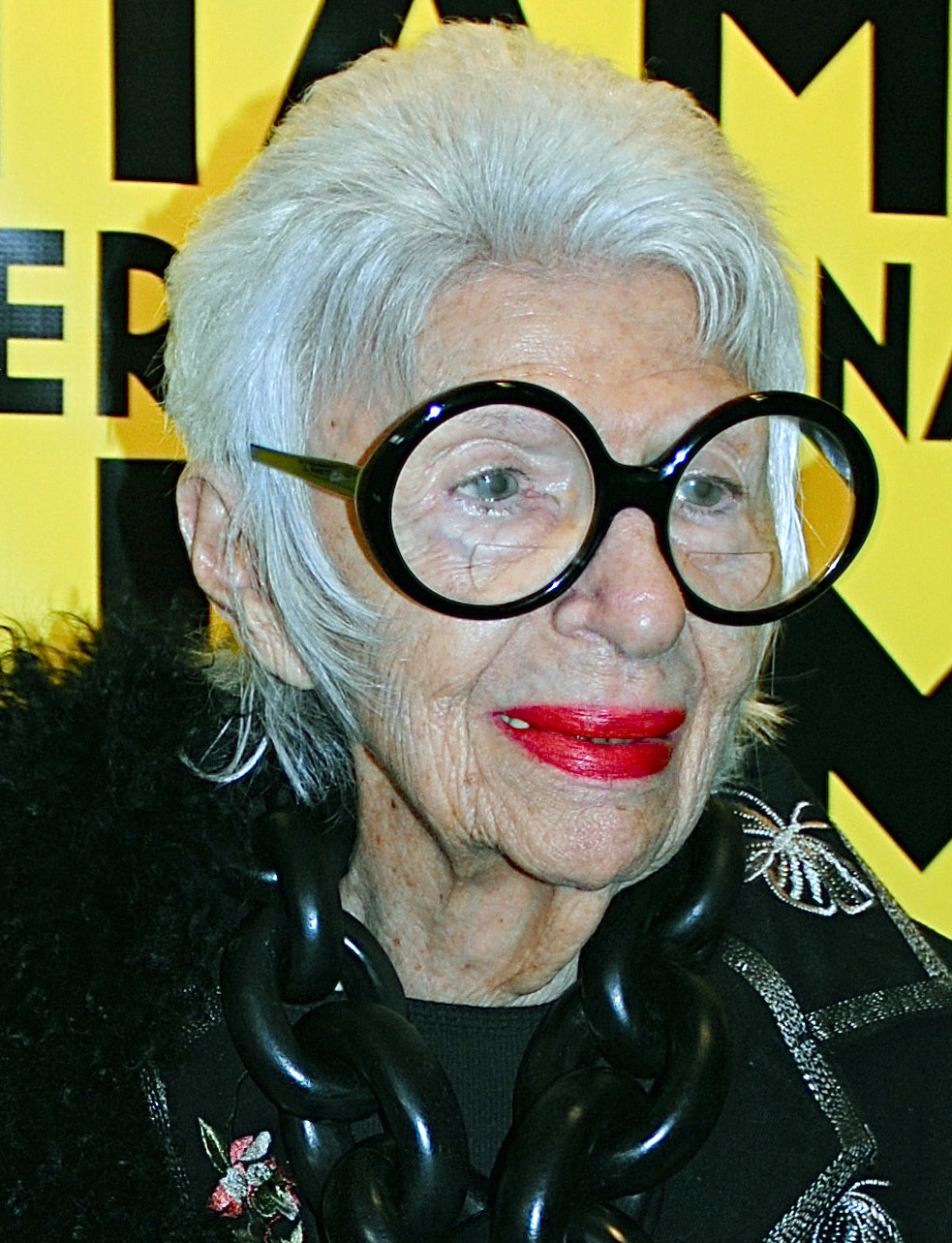
Iris Apfel

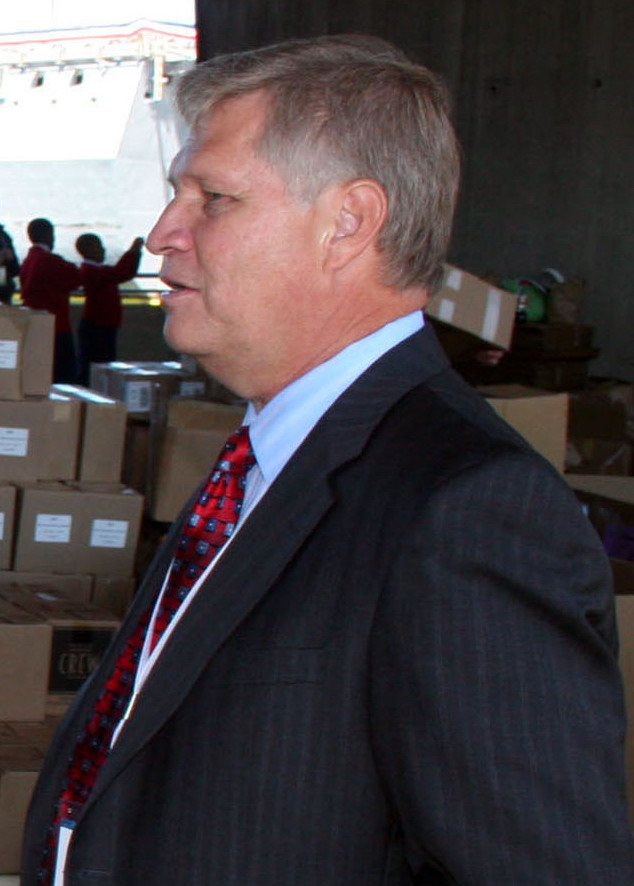
Chris Mortensen

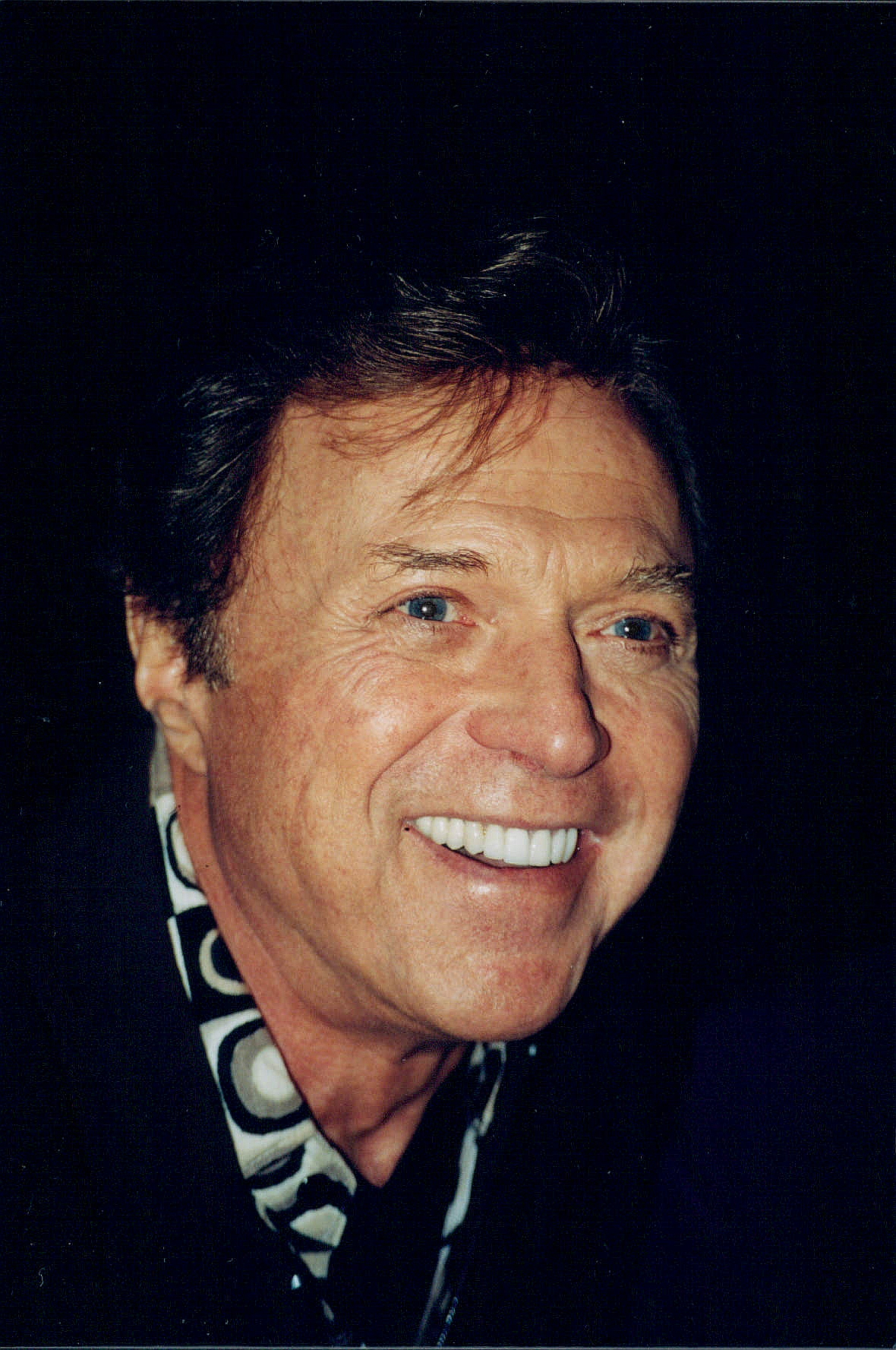
Steve Lawrence

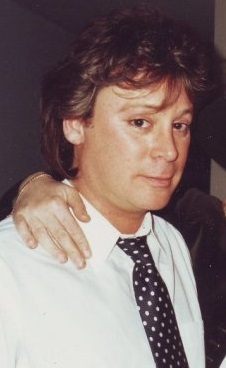
Eric Carmen

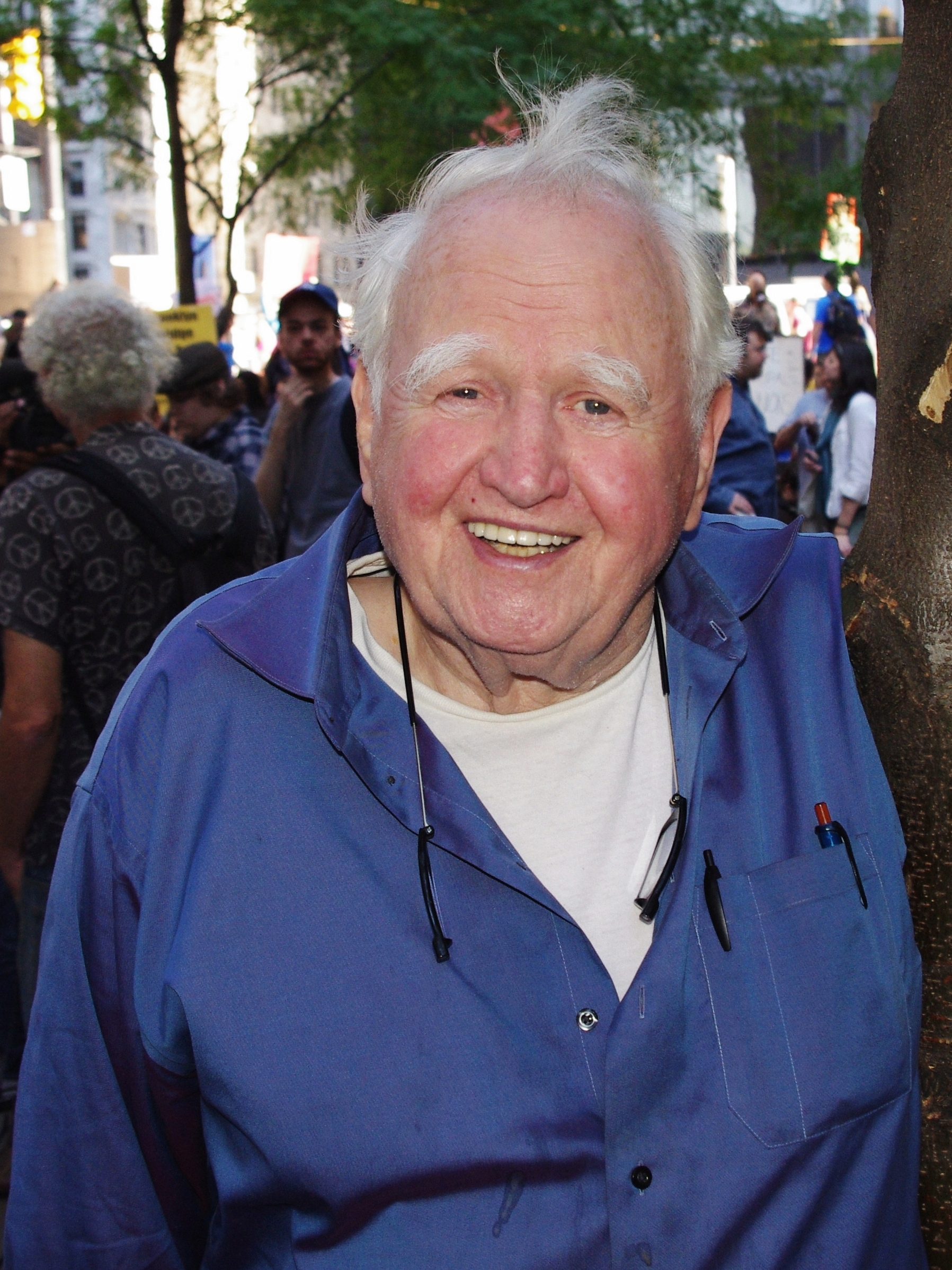
Malachy McCourt

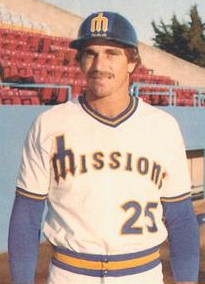
Bill Plummer

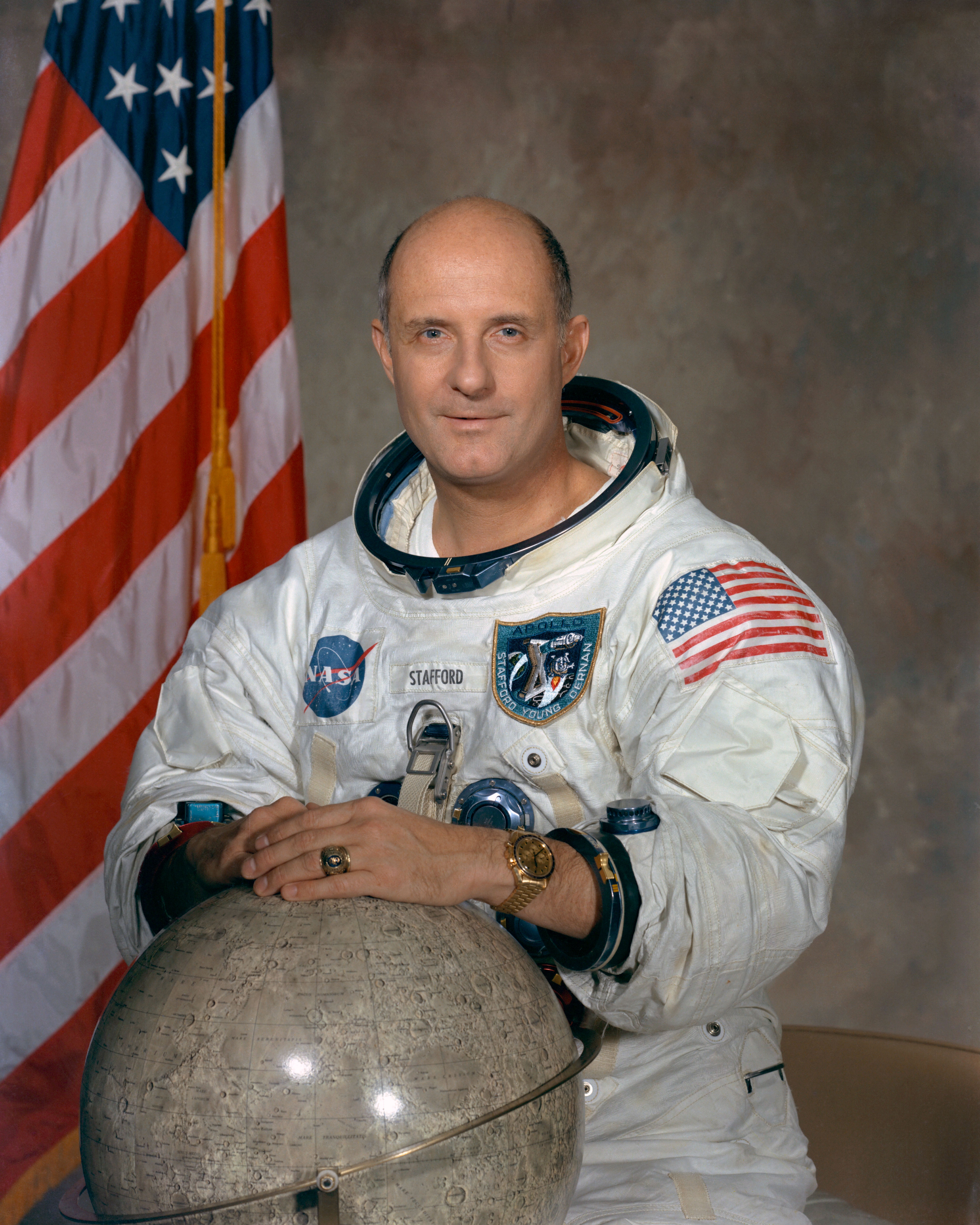
Thomas P. Stafford

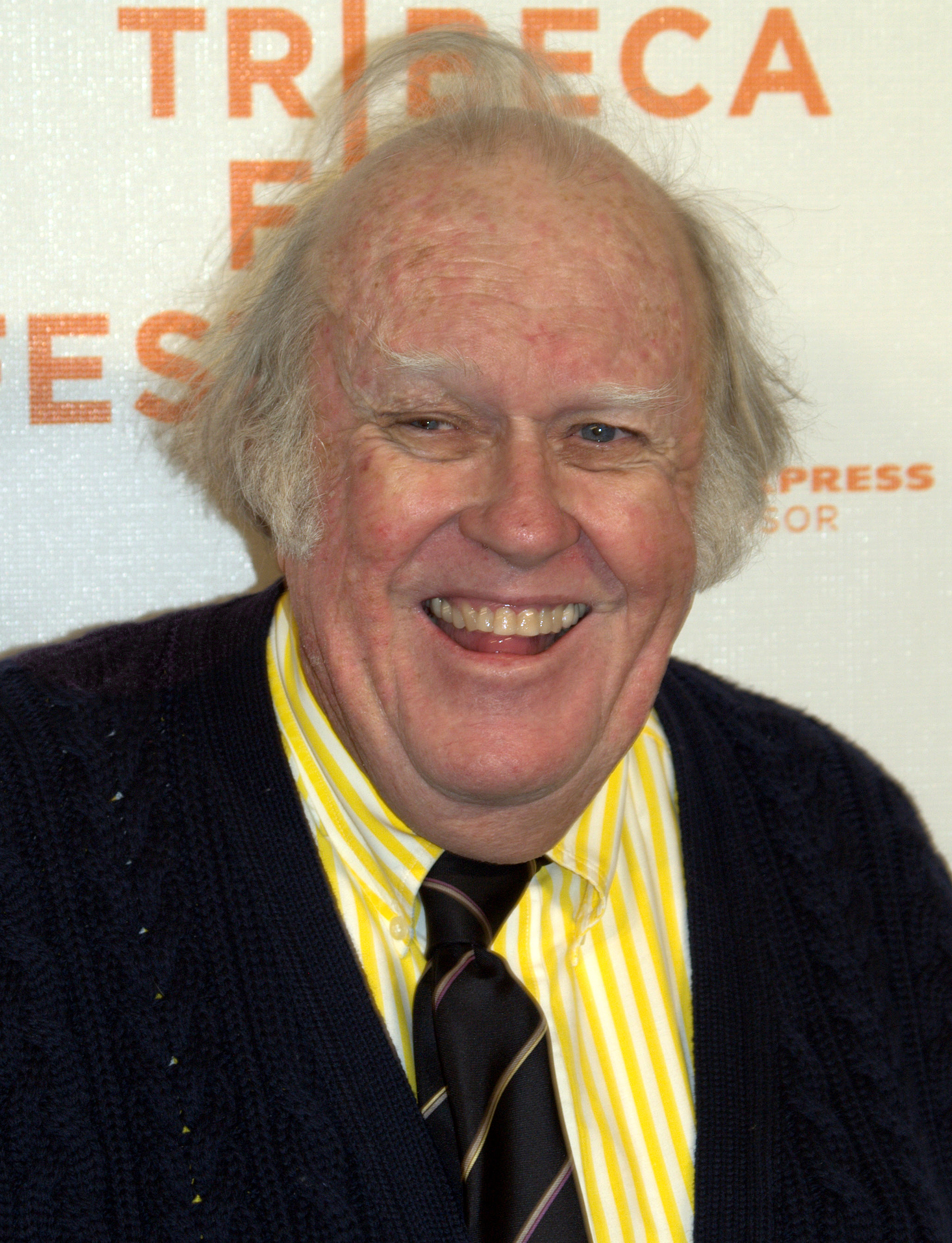
M. Emmet Walsh

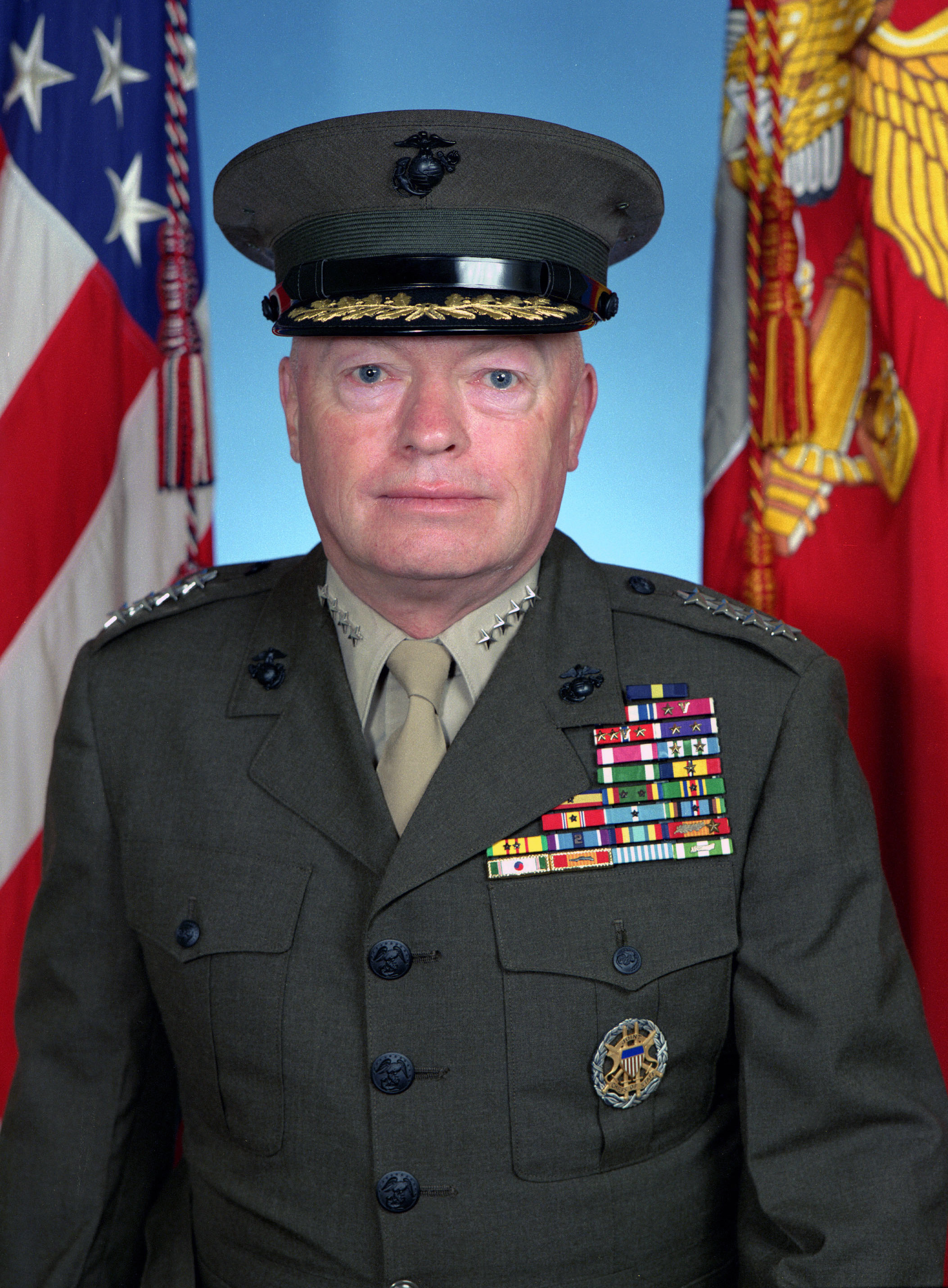
Alfred M. Gray Jr.

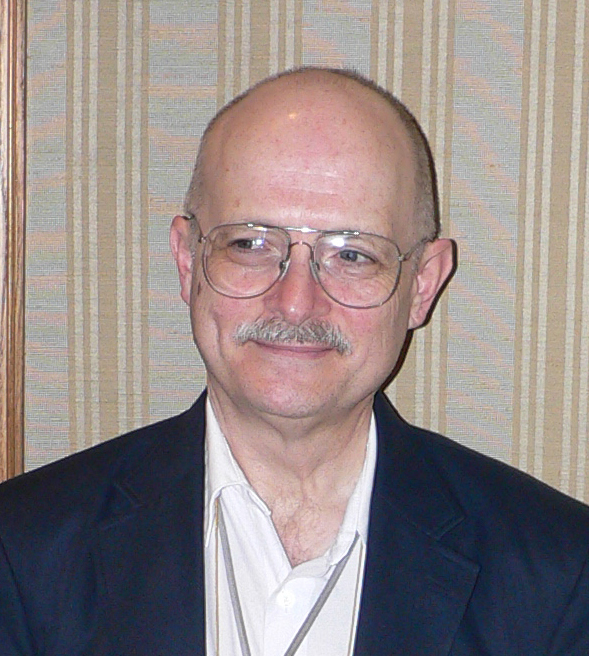
Vernor Vinge

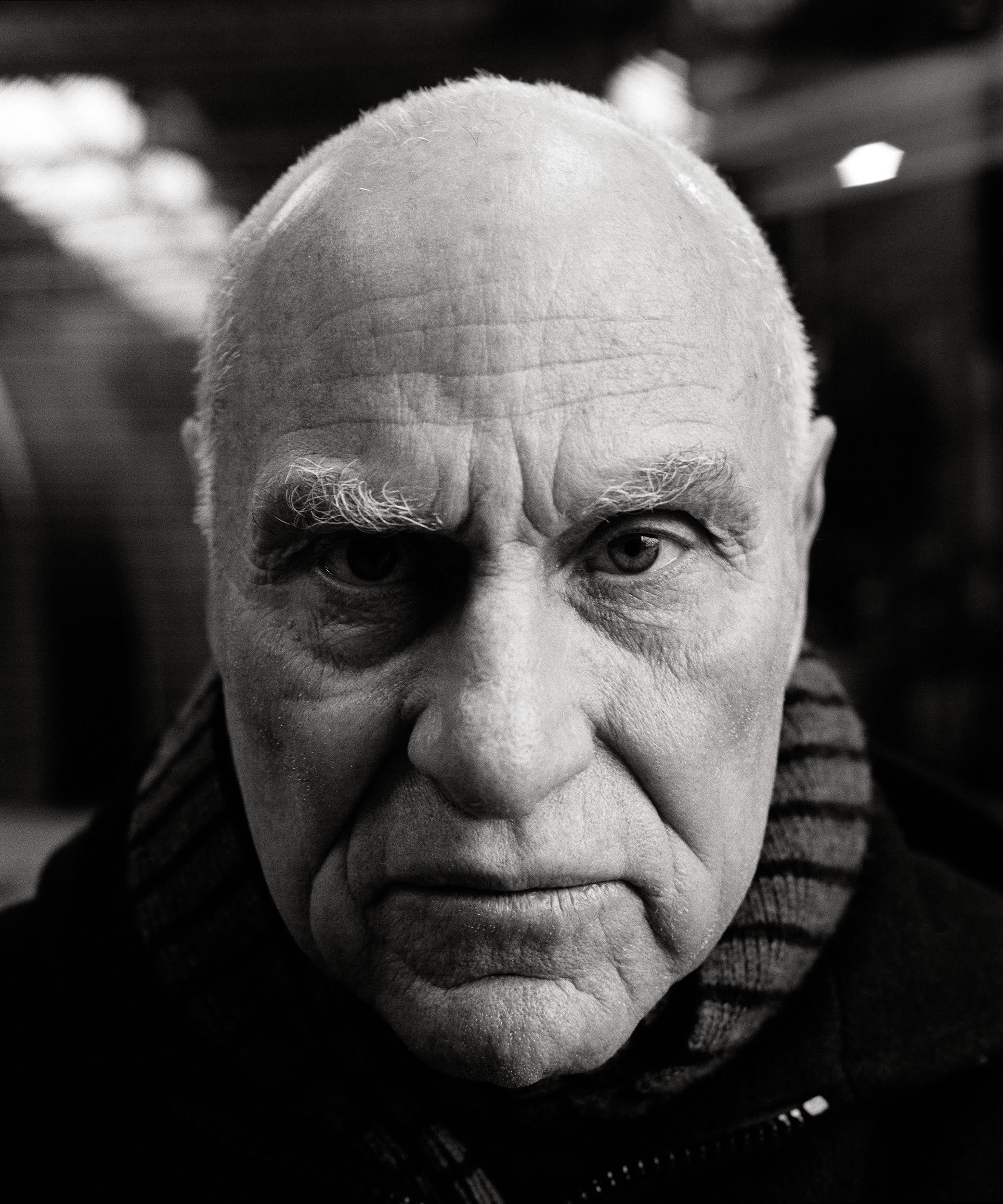
Richard Serra

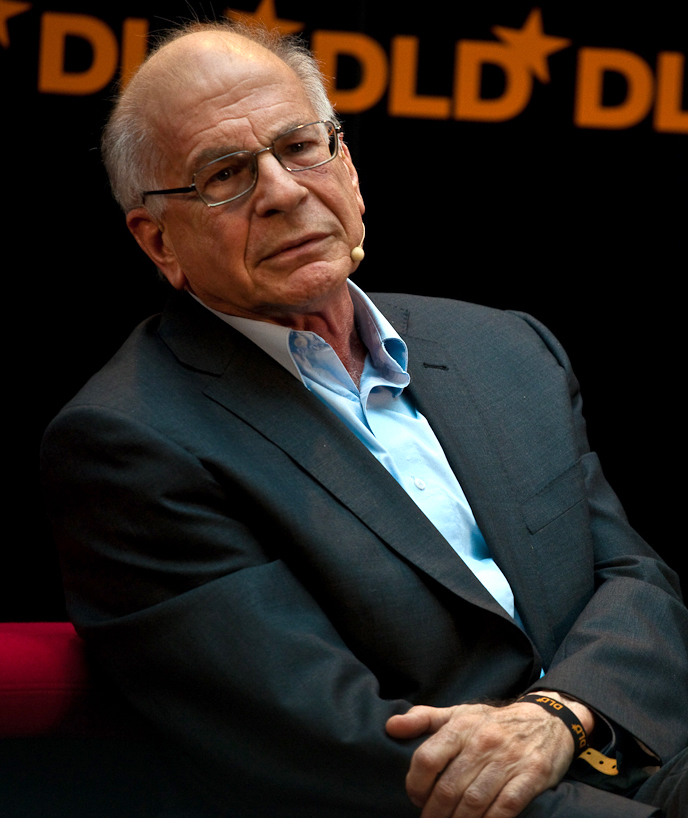
Daniel Kahneman

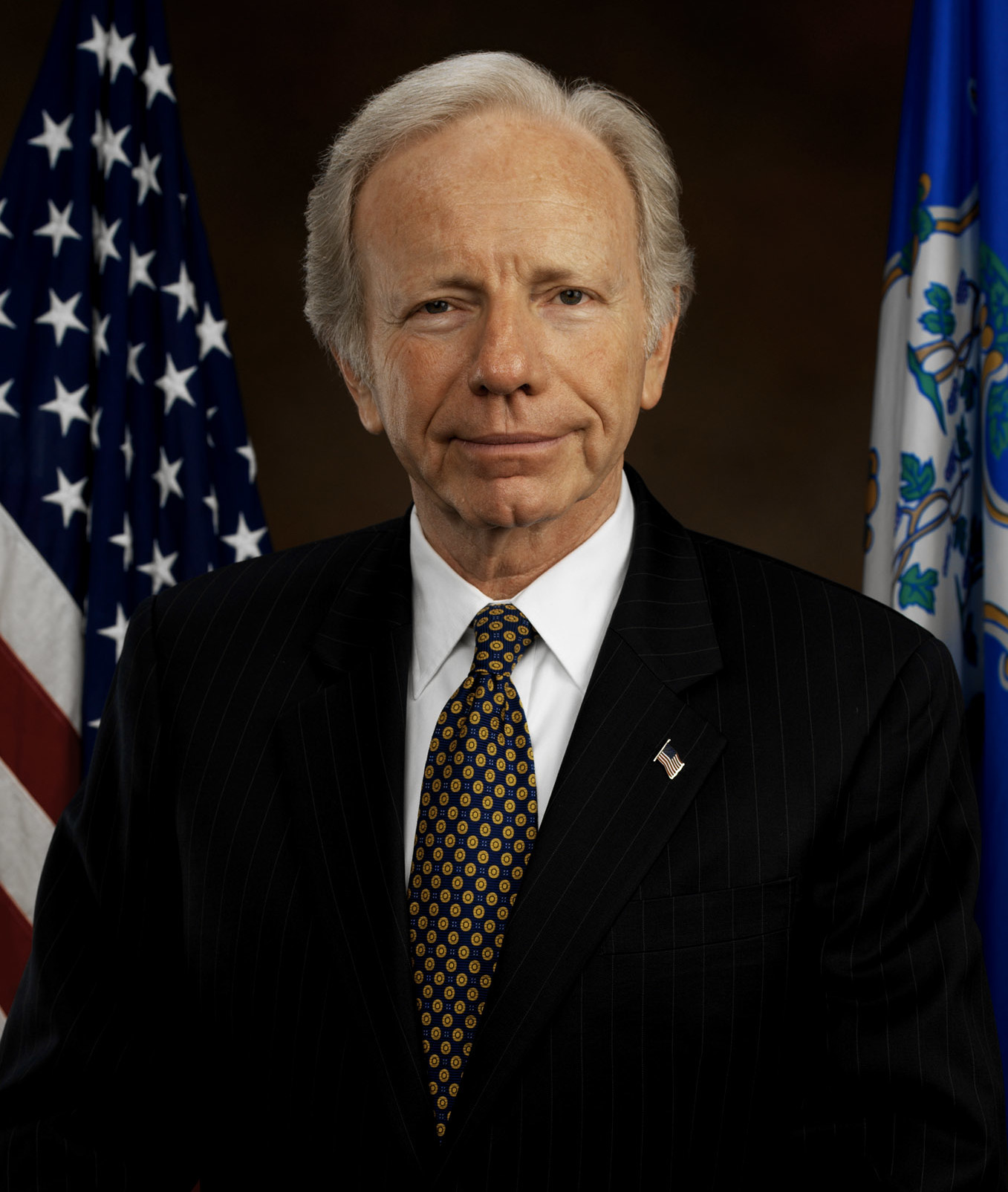
Joe Lieberman

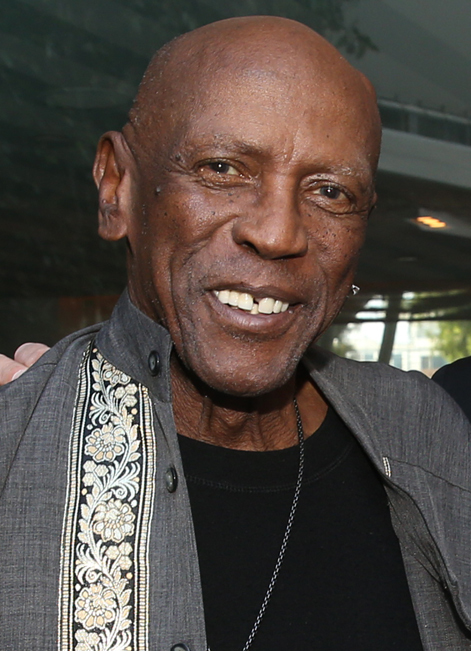
Louis Gossett Jr.

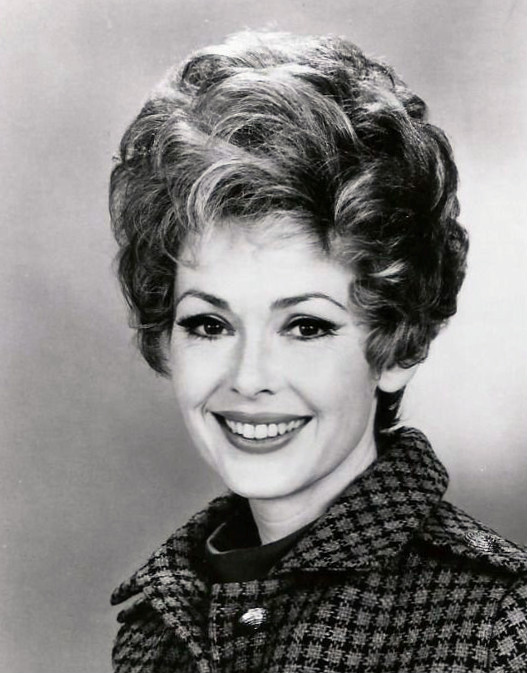
Barbara Rush

- March 1
  - Iris Apfel, 102, businesswoman, interior designer, fashion designer and actress (b. 1921)
  - Pauline Eisenstadt, 84, politician, member of the New Mexico Legislature (b. 1939)
  - Gerald Gustafson, 95, fighter pilot (b. 1928)
  - David Johnson, 97, photographer (b. 1926)
  - Charles Kurfess, 94, politician, member of the Ohio House of Representatives (1957–1978) (b. 1930)
- March 2
  - Jim Beard, 63, keyboardist (Steely Dan) (b. 1960)
  - Janice Burgess, 72, television writer, producer and executive (The Backyardigans, Winx Club, Blue's Clues) (b. 1952)
  - W. C. Clark, 84, blues musician (b. 1939)
  - Mark Dodson, 64, voice actor (Gremlins, Return of the Jedi, Day of the Dead) (b. 1960)
  - Eskendereya, 17, Thoroughbred racehorse (b. 2007) (death announced on this date)
  - Leonard Everett Fisher, 99, children's books illustrator (b. 1924)
  - Mark F. Giuliano, 62, law enforcement official, FBI deputy director (2013–2016) (b. 1961)
  - Howard Hiatt, 98, medical researcher (b. 1925)
  - Tizway, 19, Thoroughbred racehorse (b. 2005)
- March 3
  - Juli Lynne Charlot, 101, actress and fashion designer (b. 1922)
  - Carl Madison, 93, high school football coach (J. M. Tate High School, Pine Forest High School) (b. 1931)
  - Chris Mortensen, 72, sports reporter and columnist (The Atlanta Journal-Constitution, ESPN) (b. 1951)
  - Antoine Predock, 87, architect (b. 1936) (death announced on this date)
  - Ed Ott, 72, baseball player (Pittsburgh Pirates, California Angels) (b. 1951)
  - Jim Trujillo, 84, politician, member of the New Mexico House of Representatives (2002–2020) (b. 1939/1940)
  - Brit Turner, 57, drummer (Blackberry Smoke) (b. 1966/1967)
  - U. L. Washington, 70, baseball player (Kansas City Royals, Montreal Expos, Pittsburgh Pirates) (b. 1953)
- March 4
  - Jim Anderson, 86, college basketball coach (Oregon State Beavers) (b. 1937)
  - Char-ron Dorsey, 46, football player (Dallas Cowboys, Houston Texans) (b. 1977)
  - Paryse Martin, 64, American-born Canadian artist (b. 1959)
- March 5
  - Linda Balgord, 64, Broadway actress (Cats, The Pirate Queen, The Phantom of the Opera) (b. 1960)
  - Debra Byrd, 72, vocalist (b. 1951)
  - Morton Povman, 93, politician, member of the New York City Council (1971–2001) (b. 1931)
- March 6
  - Ted Gray, 96, politician, member of the Ohio Senate (1951–1994) (b. 1927)
  - Brian Nestande, 60, politician, member of the California State Assembly (2008–2014) (b. 1964)
- March 7
  - John Isenbarger, 76, football player (San Francisco 49ers) (b. 1947)
  - Steve Lawrence, 88, singer ("Go Away Little Girl", "Footsteps") and actor (The Blues Brothers) (b. 1935)
  - Wayne Moses, 69, football coach (UCLA Bruins, Pittsburgh Panthers, St. Louis Rams) (b. 1955)
  - Jim Roddey, 91, politician, Allegheny County chief executive (2000–2004) (b. 1933)
  - Lucas Samaras, 87, Greek-born artist (b. 1936)
- March 8
  - Herbert Kroemer, 95, German-American physicist, Nobel Prize laureate (2000) (b. 1928)
  - William Whitworth, 87, journalist (New York Herald Tribune, The New Yorker, The Atlantic) and author (b. 1937)
- March 9
  - John Barnett, 62, aerospace engineer (Boeing) (b. 1961/1962)
  - Tony Braswell, 79, politician, mayor of Pine Level (1999–2003) (b. 1944/1945)
  - David E. Harris, 89, pilot (b. 1934) (death announced on this date)
  - Malcolm Holcombe, 68, singer-songwriter (b. 1955)
  - Dave Ritchie, 85, football coach (Montreal Alouettes, Winnipeg Blue Bombers, Zurich Renegades) (b. 1938)
- March 10
  - Ernie Clark, 86, football player (Detroit Lions, St. Louis Cardinals) (b. 1937)
  - Jerry Foley, 68, television director (Late Show with David Letterman) (b. 1955/1956) (death announced on this date)
  - Blake Harrison, 48, musician (Pig Destroyer, Hatebeak) (b. 1975/1976)
  - T. M. Stevens, 72, bass guitarist (The Pretenders) (b. 1951)
- March 11
  - Paul Alexander, 78, lawyer and paralytic polio survivor (b. 1946)
  - Boss, 54, rapper ("Deeper") (b. 1969)
  - Eric Carmen, 74, singer (Raspberries) and songwriter ("Go All the Way", "All by Myself") (b. 1949) (death announced on this date)
  - Dorie Ladner, 81, civil rights activist (b. 1942)
  - Malachy McCourt, 92, actor (Ryan's Hope) and writer (b. 1931)
  - David Mixner, 77, political activist and author (b. 1946)
  - Pete Rodriguez, 91, pianist and bandleader (b. 1932)
- March 12
  - Robyn Bernard, 64, actress (General Hospital) (b. 1959) (body discovered on this date)
  - Terry Everett, 87, politician, member of the U.S. House of Representatives (1993–2009) (b. 1937)
  - Michael Knott, 61, singer-songwriter (Lifesavers Underground) (b. 1962)
  - John Lomax, 72, journalist (WKRC) (b. 1951)
  - Yong Soon Min, 70, Korean-born artist (b. 1953)
  - Bill Plummer, 76, baseball player (Cincinnati Reds) and coach (Seattle Mariners, Colorado Rockies), World Series champion (1975, 1976) (b. 1947)
  - Bernard L. Schwartz, 98, businessman, CEO of Loral Space & Communications (1972–2006) (b. 1925)
- March 13
  - Bill Jorgensen, 96, television anchor (WNYW, WPIX) (b. 1927)
  - Gerald M. Levin, 84, media executive (Time Warner) (b. 1939)
  - Ira Millstein, 97, antitrust lawyer (b. 1926)
  - Dan Wakefield, 91, novelist, journalist and screenwriter (Going All the Way) (b. 1932)
  - Edwin Wilson, 101, academic administrator and professor of English literature (Wake Forest University) (b. 1923)
- March 14
  - Walter Blum, 89, jockey, winner of Belmont Stakes aboard Pass Catcher (1971) (b. 1934)
  - David Breashears, 68, mountaineer and filmmaker (Everest) (b. 1955)
  - Fred Faour, 64, author and radio personality (KFNC) (b. 1964)
  - Byron Janis, 95, classical pianist (b. 1928)
  - Mike Lude, 101, football (Colorado State Rams) and baseball (Maine Black Bears) coach (b. 1922)
  - Jim McAndrew, 80, professional baseball player (New York Mets, San Diego Padres), and World Series champion (1969) (b. 1944)
- March 15
  - Joe Camp, 84, film director (Benji, Hawmps!, The Double McGuffin) and writer (b. 1939)
  - Steve Tensi, 81, football player (San Diego Chargers, Denver Broncos) (b. 1942)
- March 16
  - Jared Cohon, 76, academic administrator, president of Carnegie Mellon University (1997–2013) (b. 1947)
  - Dave Gunther, 86, basketball player (Detroit Pistons, San Francisco Warriors) (b. 1937)
  - David Seidler, 86, playwright and screenwriter (Tucker: The Man and His Dream, The King and I, The King's Speech) (b. 1937)
  - Alan Sieroty, 93, politician, member of the California State Assembly (1967–1977) and Senate (1977–1982) (b. 1930)
  - Don Smerek, 66, football player (Dallas Cowboys) (b. 1957)
- March 17
  - Cola Boyy, 34, singer and disability activist (b. 1990)
  - Sandra Crouch, 81, gospel singer, Grammy winner (1984), and minister (b. 1942)
  - Timothy Hayward, 82, politician, member of the Vermont House of Representatives (1976–1978) (b. 1941)
- March 18
  - James D. Robinson III, 88, bank holding executive, CEO of American Express (1977–1993) (b. 1935)
  - Thomas P. Stafford, 93, astronaut (Apollo 10) (b. 1930)
  - James M. Ward, 72, game designer (Dungeons & Dragons) (b. 1951)
- March 19
  - BrolyLegs, 35, professional fighting game player (b. 1988) (death announced on this date)
  - Neeli Cherkovski, 78, poet (b. 1945)
  - Dianne Crittenden, 82, casting director (Star Wars, Pretty Woman, Spider-Man 2) (b. 1941)
  - Greg Lee, 53, singer (Hepcat) (b. 1971/1972)
  - M. Emmet Walsh, 88, actor (Blade Runner, Blood Simple, Critters) (b. 1935)
- March 20
  - Gene Elders, 80, musician (fiddle) (Ace in the Hole Band) (b. 1943/1944)
  - Alfred M. Gray Jr., 95, military officer, commandant of the Marine Corps (1987–1991) (b. 1928)
  - Martin Greenfield, 95, master tailor (b. 1928)
  - Vernor Vinge, 79, science fiction writer (A Fire Upon the Deep, A Deepness in the Sky, Rainbows End) and professor (b. 1944)
  - Bennett Braun, 83, psychiatrist and proponent of the Satanic panic conspiracy theory (b. 1940)
- March 21
  - Ron Harper, 91, actor (Garrison's Gorillas, Planet of the Apes, Land of the Lost) (b. 1933)
  - Hal Malchow, 72, political consultant (b. 1951)
  - Richard Quinn, 79, political consultant (b. 1945)
  - Sarah-Ann Shaw, 90, journalist and television reporter (WBZ-TV) (b. 1933)
  - Barry Silver, 67, attorney and politician, member of the Florida House of Representatives (1996–1998) (b. 1956)
- March 22
  - Art Ellison, 80, politician, member of the New Hampshire House of Representatives (since 2018).
  - Martin L. Greenberg, 92, politician, member of the New Jersey Senate (1974–1979) (b. 1932)
  - Carl A. Parker, 89, politician, member of the Texas House of Representatives (1962–1977) and Senate (1977–1995) (b. 1934)
  - Leo Sanford, 94, football player (Chicago Cardinals, Baltimore Colts) (b. 1929)
  - Chuck Seelbach, 76, baseball player (Detroit Tigers) (b. 1948)
- March 23
  - Peter Angelos, 94, lawyer and owner of the Baltimore Orioles (1993–2024) (b. 1929)
  - Linda Bean, 82, retailer (L.L.Bean) (b. 1941)
  - Benny Keister, 83, politician (b. 1941)
  - Eli Noyes, 81, animator (b. 1942)
  - Mike Thaler, 87, author and illustrator (b. 1936)
- March 24
  - George Abbey, 91, engineer, director of the Johnson Space Center (b. 1932)
  - Vincent Bonham, 67, singer (Raydio) (b. 1956/1957) (death announced on this date)
  - Robert Moskowitz, 88, painter (b. 1935)
  - Marjorie Perloff, 92, poetry scholar (b. 1931)
  - Lou Whittaker, 95, mountaineer (b. 1929)
- March 25
  - Philip Needleman, 85, academic and pharmacologist (b. 1939)
  - Nancy Valverde, 92, LGBT rights activist (b. 1932)
  - Diana Wall, 80, environmental scientist and soil ecologist (b. 1943/1944)
  - Paula Weinstein, 78, film and television producer (The Fabulous Baker Boys, The Perfect Storm, Grace and Frankie) (b. 1945)
  - Larry J. Young, 73–74, psychiatrist (b. 1950) (death announced on this date)
- March 26
  - Esther Coopersmith, 94, American diplomat, UNESCO goodwill ambassador (since 2009) (b. 1930)
  - Brigid Kelly, 40, politician, member of the Ohio House of Representatives (2017–2022) (b. 1983)
  - Richard Phelan, 86, politician, president of the Cook County Board of Commissioners (1990–1994) (b. 1937)
  - Richard Serra, 85, sculptor (b. 1938)
- March 27
  - Robert Beerbohm, 71, comic book historian (b. 1952)
  - Harry E. Gallagher Jr., 92, politician (b. 1932)
  - Daniel Kahneman, 90, Israeli-born psychologist, Nobel Prize recipient (2002) (b. 1934)
  - Joe Lieberman, 82, politician, Senator from Connecticut (1989–2013) and Democratic vice presidential nominee in 2000 (b. 1942)
  - James R. McNutt, 89, politician, member of the Michigan House of Representatives (1991–1992, 1993–1998) (b. 1935)
  - James A. Moore, 58, horror novelist, short story writer, and role-playing game author (b. 1965)
- March 28
  - Mike Green, 75, politician, member of the Michigan Senate (2011–2019) and House of Representatives (1995–2000) (b. 1948)
  - Tom Henry, 72, politician, mayor of Fort Wayne, Indiana (since 2008) (b. 1951)
  - Robert J. LaFortune, 97, politician, mayor of Tulsa, Oklahoma (1970–1978) (b. 1927)
  - Bill Neal, 92, football player and coach (Indiana University of Pennsylvania) (b. 1931)
  - Mark Spiro, 66–67, songwriter ("Are You Still in Love with Me", "I'll See You in My Dreams", "Mighty Wings") and record producer (b. 1957)
  - Walt Wesley, 79d, basketball player (Cincinnati Royals, Chicago Bulls, Cleveland Cavaliers) (b. 1945)
  - Marian Zazeela, 83, visual and musical artist (b. 1940)
- March 29
  - Louis Gossett Jr., 87, actor (An Officer and a Gentleman, Enemy Mine, Iron Eagle) (b. 1936)
  - Hugh Lawson, 82, jurist, judge (since 1995) and chief judge (2006–2008) of the U.S. District Court of Middle Georgia (b. 1941)
  - Chance Perdomo, 27, actor (Chilling Adventures of Sabrina, Gen V, Killed by My Debt) (b. 1996)
  - Peter Shapiro, 71, businessman and politician, member of the New Jersey General Assembly (1979–1982), Essex County Executive (1979–1987) (b. 1952)
- March 30
  - Bill Delahunt, 82, politician, member of the U.S. House of Representatives (1997–2011) (b. 1941)
  - James Ross MacDonald, 101, physicist (b. 1923)
  - Tim McGovern, 68, visual effects artist (Total Recall, Last Action Hero, Mission: Impossible – Rogue Nation) (b. 1955)
- March 31
  - Barbara Baldavin, 85, actress (Star Trek: The Original Series) and casting director (b. 1938)
  - Casey Benjamin, 45, musician (Robert Glasper Experiment), producer, and songwriter (b. 1978)
  - Barbara Rush, 97, actress (It Came from Outer Space, The Young Philadelphians, The Young Lions) (b. 1927)
