= Deaths in January 2024 =

The following is a list of notable deaths in January 2024.

Entries for each day are listed alphabetically by surname. A typical entry lists information in the following sequence:

- Name, age, country of citizenship at birth, subsequent country of citizenship (if applicable), reason for notability, cause of death (if known), and reference.

== January 2024 ==
=== 1 ===
- Adaora Adimora, 67, American doctor and academic, cancer.
- Anthony J. Alvarado, 81, American educator, New York City Schools Chancellor (1983–1984), blood cancer and pneumonia.
- Camila Batmanghelidjh, 61, Iranian-Belgian charity executive, founder of Kids Company.
- Sandra Blewett, 74, New Zealand swimmer and coach.
- Mario Boljat, 72, Croatian footballer (Hajduk Split, Schalke 04, Yugoslavia national team).
- James Herbert Brennan, 83, Irish author (The Faerie Wars Chronicles, The Occult Reich).
- Khemais Chammari, 81, Tunisian diplomat, human rights activist, and politician, deputy (1994–1996).
- Chang Chih-chia, 43, Taiwanese Olympic baseball player (2004, 2008), heart attack.
- John Cockin, 84, English-Swedish golfer.
- Ries Coté, 77, Dutch footballer (Elinkwijk, Utrecht).
- Mickey Cottrell, 79, American film publicist and actor (My Own Private Idaho, Volcano, Ed Wood), complications from Parkinson's disease.
- Ole Daniel Enersen, 80, Norwegian climber, journalist, and writer.
- Marcia Garbey, 74, Cuban Olympic long jumper (1968, 1972).
- J. Russell George, 60, American attorney, treasury inspector general for tax administration (since 2004).
- André Hissink, 104, Dutch World War II veteran (No. 320 Squadron).
- John Kinsella, 76, Irish hurler (Kilkenny, Bennettsbridge).
- Lynja, 67, American chef and social media influencer, complications from esophageal cancer.
- Peter Magubane, 91, South African photographer, cancer.
- Ved Prakash Nanda, 89, Indian-American legal scholar, complications from a fall.
- Lawrence Sydney Nicasio, 67, Belizean Roman Catholic prelate, bishop of Belize City-Belmopan (since 2017), cancer.
- Jack O'Connell, 64, American author.
- Óscar Ortubé, 79, Bolivian football referee.
- Basdeo Panday, 90, Trinidadian politician, prime minister (1995–2001) and minister of foreign affairs (1987–1988), pneumonia.
- Franz Paulweber, 70, Austrian Olympic bobsledder.
- Hartmut Ritzerfeld, 73, German painter, complications from a traffic collision.
- Frank Ryan, 87, American football player (Los Angeles Rams, Cleveland Browns, Washington Redskins) and mathematician, complications from Alzheimer's disease.
- David J. Skal, 71, American film historian and author, traffic collision.
- Iwona Śledzińska-Katarasińska, 82, Polish politician, MP (1991–2023).
- Hans Sleeswijk, 88, Dutch Olympic sailor (1960).
- Graham Tripp, 91, English cricketer (Somerset).
- Riad al-Turk, 93, Syrian political dissident.
- René Verzier, 89, Canadian cinematographer (The Morning Man, Toby McTeague, Valérie).
- Leslie Watson, 78, British long-distance runner and powerlifter, blood clot.
- Niklaus Wirth, 89, Swiss computer scientist (Pascal).
- Sidney M. Wolfe, 86, American medical doctor and health activist, brain tumor.
- Michele Zolla, 91, Italian government official and politician, deputy (1972–1992).

=== 2 ===
- Noel Aguirre, 63, Bolivian politician, economist and academic, COVID-19.
- An Deok-gi, 83, South Korean Olympic equestrian.
- Saleh al-Arouri, 57, Palestinian militant, commander of the Izz ad-Din al-Qassam Brigades (since 1993), airstrike.
- Sartaj Aziz, 94, Pakistani politician and economist, minister of foreign affairs (1998–1999, 2013–2017), national security advisor (2013–2015) and three-time minister of finance.
- Peter Berkos, 101, American sound editor (The Hindenburg, Slap Shot, The Great Waldo Pepper), Oscar winner (1975).
- Bùi Dzinh, 94–95, Vietnamese military officer.
- Susan Campbell, 92, English illustrator, food writer and garden historian.
- Ángel Castellanos, 71, Spanish footballer (Valencia, Granada, national team), complications from Alzheimer's disease.
- John Cress, 88, American Olympic skier (1960).
- Edward E. Crutchfield, 82, American banker.
- Seán Donnelly, 83, Irish Gaelic footballer (University College Galway, Longford Slashers, Longford).
- Cameron Dunkin, 67, American professional boxing manager, cancer.
- Alberto Festa, 84, Portuguese footballer (Porto, Tirsense, national team).
- David P. Gardner, 90, American academic administrator, president of the University of Utah (1973–1983) and the University of California (1983–1992).
- Gu Xinyi, 86, Chinese engineer.
- Andreas Heldal-Lund, 59, Norwegian activist (Operation Clambake), brain tumour.
- Juan Carlos Henao Pérez, 64, Colombian jurist (Colombian peace agreement) and academic, president of the Constitutional Court (2009–2010) and rector of Universidad Externado (2012–2021).
- Bobby Hoy, 73, English footballer (Huddersfield Town, Halifax Town, Blackburn Rovers).
- Chris Karrer, 76, German guitarist and composer (Amon Düül II), COVID-19.
- Qaiser Rashid Khan, 62, Pakistani jurist, chief justice of the Peshawar High Court (2021–2023), stroke.
- Lemont Kier, 93, American chemist.
- Sir Frank Kitson, 97, British military officer, Commander-in-Chief, Land Forces (1982–1985) and deputy commander field army (1980–1982).
- Osvaldo Lara, 68, Cuban Olympic sprinter (1980).
- Brian Lumley, 86, British author (Necroscope, Psychomech, Beneath the Moors).
- Ronald Lunas, 57, Filipino Roman Catholic prelate, bishop of Pagadian (since 2018), complications from heart surgery.
- Connie Madigan, 89, Canadian ice hockey player (St. Louis Blues).
- E. Leo Milonas, 87, American judge and lawyer, chief administrative judge of New York State (1993–1995), heart failure.
- Gottfried Münzenberg, 83, German physicist.
- Rizal Ramli, 69, Indonesian politician, minister of finance (2001), coordinating minister for maritime affairs (2015–2016) and economic affairs (2000–2001), pancreatic cancer.
- Daniel Revenu, 81, French fencer, Olympic champion (1968) and five-time bronze medalist.
- Matisyahu Salomon, 86, English-born American rabbi.
- Orlando Savarin, 85, Italian Olympic rower (1964).
- Michael Schwartz, 86, American academic administrator.
- Alexis Smith, 74, American visual artist, complications from Alzheimer's disease.
- Gordon R. Sullivan, 86, American general, chief of staff of the Army (1991–1995).
- Poul Svendsen, 96, Danish rower, Olympic bronze medalist (1952).
- Carmen Valero, 68, Spanish Olympic middle-distance runner (1976), stroke.
- Rafael Valle, 85, Puerto Rican Olympic basketball player (1960).
- Tavares Washington, 40, American football player (Kansas City Chiefs).
- Ron Wells, 88, Australian politician, Victoria AM (1985–1992).
- Richard Woodcock, 95, American psychometrician.
- Zvi Zamir, 98, Polish-born Israeli military officer, director of the Mossad (1968–1974).

=== 3 ===
- Vladimir Ageyev, 91, Russian painter.
- Juan Alemann, 96, Argentine doctor and politician.
- Arévalo, 76, Spanish comedian and actor (Moscow Gold).
- Frédéric Bluche, 72, French legal historian.
- Geoffrey Boothroyd, 91, British-born American manufacturing engineer and academic.
- Sebastian Brodrick, 85, Nigerian Olympic footballer (1968) and coach, complications from a stroke.
- Donald D. Clayton, 88, American astrophysicist.
- Mario Crescenzio, 81, Italian politician, senator (1994–2001).
- Lillian Crombie, 66, Australian actress (The Place at the Coast, Deadly, Jindalee Lady) and dancer.
- Bridget Dobson, 85, American television writer (General Hospital, The Guiding Light) and producer (Santa Barbara).
- Germana Dominici, 77, Italian actress (Black Sunday, Mi vedrai tornare, Il ragazzo del Pony Express).
- Derek Draper, 56, English lobbyist and political adviser, complications from a heart attack and COVID-19.
- Bernard Ducuing, 73, French footballer (Red Star, Reims, Montpellier).
- Günther Fielmann, 84, German eyewear retailer, founder of Fielmann.
- Billy Gardner, 96, American baseball player (Baltimore Orioles, New York Yankees) and coach (Minnesota Twins).
- Donald W. Hasenohrl, 88, American politician, member of the Wisconsin State Assembly (1975–2001).
- Charles O. Jones, 92, American political scientist, stroke.
- Karsten Knolle, 84, German journalist and politician, MEP (1999–2004).
- Fred T. Mackenzie, 89, American sedimentary and global biogeochemist.
- René Metge, 82, French rally driver.
- Imoro Muniratu, 72, Ghanaian food vendor.
- Kunihiko Muroi, 76, Japanese politician, MP (2003–2005, since 2007), liver failure.
- Peadar O'Dowd, Irish historian.
- Felicidad Ogumoro, 74, Northern Mariana Islands politician, member (1977–1981, 2009–2016) and vice speaker (2010–2013) of the House of Representatives.
- Anita Ontiveros, 76, Argentine-born Dominican television producer, complications from Alzheimer's disease.
- Don Read, 90, American football coach (Montana Grizzlies, Portland State Vikings, Oregon Ducks).
- Tawl Ross, 75, American rhythm guitarist (Funkadelic).
- Paul Theriault, 73, Canadian ice hockey coach (Buffalo Sabres, Erie Otters, Flint Spirits).
- J. P. S. Uberoi, 90, Indian sociologist.
- Edwill van Aarde, 85, South African television and radio broadcaster and sports commentator.
- Michael Walsh, 78, Canadian film critic.
- Sophie Wuerger, 63, American color perception researcher.
- Kameshwar Yadav, Indian politician.
- John Zylinski, 72, British property developer and Polish aristocrat.

=== 4 ===
- Felicia Abban, 87, Ghanaian photographer.
- Nancy Adler, 77, American health psychologist, pancreatic cancer.
- Ana Afonso, 47, Portuguese model and actress (Quinta das Celebridades), suicide by jumping.
- Ayla Algan, 86, Turkish singer and actress (O Hayat Benim, Binbir Gece), intracerebral haemorrhage.
- Marty Amsler, 81, American football player (Chicago Bears, Cincinnati Bengals, Green Bay Packers).
- John Scales Avery, 90, American chemist and peace activist.
- Fred Chappell, 87, American author (Dagon) and poet.
- Gene Deer, 59, American musician.
- Ron Dewar, 82, American jazz saxophonist.
- Raymond Elena, 92, French racing cyclist.
- Marty Engstrom, 86, American weather presenter.
- Fabio Fabbri, 90, Italian politician, senator (1976–1994), minister of defence (1993–1994) and European affairs (1986–1987).
- Georgina Hale, 80, British actress (Mahler, The Devils, Castaway).
- Glynis Johns, 100, British actress (Mary Poppins, A Little Night Music, The Sundowners), Tony winner (1973).
- Elliott D. Kieff, 80, American virologist.
- Keith Lamb, 77, English football executive, chief executive of Middlesbrough (1987–2011).
- Bernhard Lewkovitch, 96, Danish composer.
- Nancy Mackay, 101, Canadian sprinter, Olympic bronze medalist (1948).
- Alice Mason, 100, American real estate broker and socialite.
- Asfaw Meshesha, 56–57, Ethiopian talk show host (EBS TV), brain cancer.
- Ruy Mingas, 84, Angolan composer (national anthem), musician and politician, deputy (2017–2021).
- Frank Q. Nebeker, 93, American jurist, judge of the District of Columbia Court of Appeals (1969–2021) and the U.S. Court of Appeals for Veterans Claims (1989–2021).
- Nur Ahmed Nur, 87, Afghan politician, minister of the interior (1978).
- Christian Oliver, 51, German actor (Speed Racer, The Good German, Saved by the Bell: The New Class), plane crash.
- Leah Owen, 70, Welsh singer.
- Emil Polit, 83, Polish painter.
- Alan Redway, 88, Canadian politician, MP (1984–1993) and mayor of East York (1977–1982).
- Rosie Reyes, 84, Mexican Olympic tennis player (1968), lung disease.
- Jaime Rogers, 83, American dancer, choreographer, and director.
- Mike Sadler, 103, British Army officer, last original member of the Special Air Service.
- Mushtaq Talib Al-Saeedi, 43, Iraqi militant commander (Harakat Hezbollah al-Nujaba), drone strike.
- Kishin Shinoyama, 83, Japanese photographer.
- David Soul, 80, American-British actor (Starsky & Hutch, Magnum Force) and singer ("Don't Give Up on Us").
- Bill W. Stacy, 85, American educator and university administrator, president of California State University San Marcos (1989–1997) and the University of Tennessee at Chattanooga (1997–2004).
- Robert Taylor, 77, British artist.
- Richard Thornton, 65, American swimmer, drowned.
- Leonid Tkachenko, 70, Ukrainian-Russian football player (Baltika Kaliningrad, Metalist Kharkiv) and manager (Dynamo Saint Petersburg).
- Oleksandr Tkachenko, 84, Ukrainian politician, MP (1994–2012) and chairman of the Verkhovna Rada (1998–2000).
- Tracy Tormé, 64, American screenwriter (Fire in the Sky) and television producer (Sliders, Star Trek: The Next Generation), complications from diabetes.
- John White, 87, English experimental musician and composer.
- Tomonobu Yokoyama, 38, Japanese footballer (Kawasaki Frontale, Omiya Ardija, Hokkaido Consadole Sapporo), brain tumour.

=== 5 ===
- Arstanbek Abdyldayev, 55, Kyrgyz political activist, suicide by hanging.
- Helena Adler, 40, Austrian writer and artist.
- Jorge Aguilar Mora, 77, Mexican poet and writer, winner of Xavier Villaurrutia Award (2015).
- Willie Bethea, 85, American football player (Hamilton Tiger-Cats).
- Carlos Bremer, 63, Mexican businessman and philanthropist, cardiac complications.
- Larry Collins, 79, American guitarist (The Collins Kids) and songwriter ("Delta Dawn").
- Giuseppe Fimognari, 91, Italian politician, senator (1979–1987).
- Norman H. Finkelstein, 82, American author and educator.
- Bob Gaiters, 85, American football player (New York Giants, San Francisco 49ers, Denver Broncos).
- Mary Jane Garcia, 87, American politician, member of the New Mexico Senate (1988–2012).
- Joachim Giermek, 80, American Franciscan Father, minister general of the Conventuals (2002–2007).
- Philip Hedley, 85, British theatre director (Theatre Royal Stratford East).
- Ronald A. Hites, 81, American environmental chemist.
- Ursula Justin, 96, German actress (Dancing Stars, The Singing Hotel, Money from the Air).
- Ryszard Karpiński, 88, Polish Roman Catholic prelate, auxiliary bishop of Lublin (1985–2011).
- Maharani Konar, 90, Indian politician, West Bengal MLA (1982–1996).
- William Lee, 82, Irish Roman Catholic prelate, bishop of Waterford and Lismore (1993–2013).
- Joseph Lelyveld, 86, American journalist (The New York Times), complications from Parkinson's disease.
- Herbert Linge, 95, German racing and rally driver.
- Bernard Malgrange, 95, French mathematician (Malgrange–Ehrenpreis theorem, Malgrange preparation theorem), member of the French Academy of Sciences.
- Jack Masters, 92, Canadian politician, MP (1980–1984) and mayor of Thunder Bay (1986–1991).
- Brian McConnachie, 81, American actor and writer (SCTV Network, Saturday Night Live, National Lampoon), complications from Parkinson's disease.
- Pat McNamara, 90, American actor (The Daytrippers, Fight Club, Archie Bunker's Place).
- Balwant Singh Nandgarh, 80, Indian Sikh leader, jathedar of the Takht Sri Damdama Sahib (2003–2015).
- Catrìona NicGumaraid, 75, Scottish poet.
- Eddie O'Connor, 76, Irish renewable energy businessman.
- Con O'Leary, 77, Irish politician.
- Del Palmer, 71, English singer-songwriter, bass guitarist, and sound engineer.
- Vinod Patel, 84, Fijian football executive and politician, MP (1992–1999) and president of Ba (1986–2001).
- James N. Purcell Jr., 85, American author and diplomat, director of the Bureau of Refugee Programs (1983–1986).
- Jean-Marie Rausch, 94, French politician, senator (1974–1988, 1992–2001) and mayor of Metz (1971–2008).
- Nicholas Rescher, 95, German-American philosopher, founder of American Philosophical Quarterly, History of Philosophy Quarterly and Public Affairs Quarterly.
- Robert Rosenthal, 90, German-born American psychologist.
- Giulio Santagata, 74, Italian politician, deputy (2001–2013).
- Dhanjibhai Senghani, Indian politician, Gujarat MLA (2007–2012). (death announced on this date)
- Dorothy Shea, 82, Australian librarian.
- Manvendra Singh, 70, Indian politician, Uttar Pradesh MLA (since 2017), liver disease.
- Jack Squirek, 64, American football player (Los Angeles Raiders).
- Richard Suinn, 90, American psychologist.
- Masood ur Rehman Usmani, Pakistani Islamic scholar, shot.
- Mário Zagallo, 92, Brazilian football player and manager (Flamengo, Botafogo, national team), four-time world champion, multiple organ failure.

=== 6 ===
- Francesco Amirante, 90, Italian magistrate, president of the Constitutional Court (2009–2010).
- Felice Besostri, 79, Italian lawyer and politician, mayor of Borgo San Giovanni (1983–1988) and senator (1996–2001).
- Aygün Beyler, 48, Azerbaijani singer and actress, breast cancer.
- Sir Roy Calne, 93, British surgeon, heart failure.
- Fernando Capalla, 89, Filipino Roman Catholic prelate, archbishop of Davao (1996–2012).
- Henri Cappetta, 77, French ichthyologist.
- Cheng Chung-chuan, 92, Taiwanese painter.
- Burke Dales, 46, Canadian football player (Calgary Stampeders, Edmonton Eskimos).
- Dix Davis, 97, American child actor (Our Town) and intelligence analyst.
- Kurt W. Forster, 88, Swiss architecture historian and teacher.
- Ricardo Gálvez, 90, Chilean lawyer, judge and academic, justice of the Supreme Court (1998–2008).
- Claude Gilbert, 91, American football coach (San Diego State Aztecs, San Jose State Spartans), lung cancer.
- Mario Giovinetto, 90, Argentine glaciologist.
- Zahirul Haque, 89, Bangladeshi footballer (Police AC, Mohammedan SC, Pakistan national team), heart attack.
- Robie Harris, 83, American author (It's Perfectly Normal, It's So Amazing!).
- Tim Hilton, 82, British journalist and author.
- Ho Weng Toh, 103, Malaysian-born Singaporean World War II bomber pilot.
- Iasos, 76, Greek-born American musician.
- Vladimir Khavinson, 77, Russian gerontologist, member of the Russian Academy of Sciences.
- Campos Machado, 84, Brazilian lawyer and politician, São Paulo MLA (1987–2023).
- Hani Al-Masdar, 42, Palestinian athlete and coach, airstrike.
- Anton Pain Ratu, 95, Indonesian Roman Catholic prelate, auxiliary bishop (1982–1984) and bishop (1984–2007) of Atambua.
- Andrew Pohorille, 74, Polish-American astrobiologist, biophysicist, and quantum chemist.
- Malcolm Price, 86, Welsh rugby union (British & Irish Lions, national team) and rugby league (Great Britain national team) player.
- Sarah Rice, 68, American actress (Sweeney Todd: The Demon Barber of Fleet Street) and singer, cancer.
- Amparo Rubín, 68, Mexican singer and lyricist, complications from Alzheimer's disease.
- Erwin Schild, 103, German-born Canadian Conservative rabbi and author.
- Suzanne Smith, 75, American politician, member of the New Hampshire House of Representatives (2008–2022).
- Sabetai Unguru, 93, Romanian-born Israeli historian.
- Pablo Varela Server, 81, Spanish Roman Catholic prelate, auxiliary bishop of Panamá (2004–2019).
- Richard Wallace, 78, New Zealand Māori Anglican bishop, Pīhopa o Te Waipounamu (since 2017).

=== 7 ===
- Joan Acocella, 78, American journalist and dance critic (The New Yorker), cancer.
- Alessandro Argenton, 86, Italian equestrian, Olympic silver medallist (1972).
- Franz Beckenbauer, 78, German football player (Bayern Munich, national team) and manager, two-time world champion and Ballon d'Or winner (1972, 1976).
- Martha Black, 78, Canadian art historian, cancer.
- Paul A. Brown, 85, American medical doctor and healthcare businessman.
- Lois Bryson, 86, Australian sociologist.
- Paul Burkett, 67, American economist, acute myeloid leukemia.
- Germana Caroli, 92, Italian singer.
- Uma Chowdhry, 76, Indian-born American chemist.
- Tony Clarkin, 77, English guitarist and songwriter (Magnum).
- Alberto Colombo, 77, Italian racing driver (Formula Two).
- Dwight Cook, 72, American politician, member of the North Dakota Senate (1997–2020).
- María Silvia Correa, 94, Chilean politician and diplomat, deputy (1965–1969) and governor of Maipo Province (1990–1994). (death announced on this date)
- Hamza Al-Dahdouh, 27, Palestinian journalist, drone strike.
- Menachem Daum, 77, German-born American documentary film-maker (A Life Apart: Hasidism in America, Hiding and Seeking).
- Rick Duckett, 66, American basketball coach (Fayetteville State Broncos, Winston-Salem State Rams, Grambling State Tigers), cancer.
- John Pat Fanning, 89, American politician and mortician, member of the West Virginia Senate (1996–2012).
- Norma Fernandes, 88, Pakistani teacher.
- József Finta, 88, Hungarian architect (InterContinental Budapest).
- Wendell Harris, 83, American football player (Baltimore Colts, New York Giants).
- Barton Jahncke, 84, American sailor, Olympic champion (1968).
- Charles E. Johnson, 87, American government official, U.S. secretary of health and human services (2009), blood cancer.
- William Edward Kettler, 101, American archaeologist and Rotary International leader.
- Kook Jong-nam, 86, South Korean businessman and politician, member of the National Assembly (1992–1996).
- Maksym Kryvtsov, 33, Ukrainian poet and soldier.
- William McColl, 90, American classical clarinetist, respiratory failure.
- Tofy Mussivand, 81, Iranian-Canadian medical engineer.
- Francisca Ravestein, 71, Dutch politician, member of the House of Representatives (1998–2002).
- John R. Rice, 89, American mathematician (Hobby–Rice theorem) and computer scientist, founder of ACM Transactions on Mathematical Software.
- Leonard Rickhard, 78, Norwegian painter.
- Mateusz Rutkowski, 37, Polish ski jumper, cardiac arrest.
- Sarah Stackhouse, 87, American dancer.
- Tim Steele, 55, American racing driver, ARCA Menards Series champion (1993, 1996, 1997), complications following a stroke.
- Arnold Taraborrelli, 92, American-Spanish choreographer.
- Edith Udhardt, 94, German politician.
- Christine Yufon, 100, Chinese-born Brazilian model, businesswoman, and artist.

=== 8 ===
- Carl-Erik Asplund, 100, Swedish speed skater, Olympic bronze medalist (1952).
- Normand de Bellefeuille, 74, Canadian poet.
- Guy Bonnet, 78, French author, composer and singer.
- Michael Brown, 87, New Zealand Anglican priest, dean of Wellington Cathedral of St Paul (1985–2002).
- Antoinette Candia-Bailey, 49, American academic administrator, suicide.
- Adan Canto, 42, Mexican actor (X-Men: Days of Future Past, Designated Survivor, The Cleaning Lady), appendiceal cancer.
- Djabrail Chahkiev, 68, Russian archaeologist.
- Joseph Esposito, 73, American police officer and civil servant, brain cancer.
- Gonzalo García Núñez, 76, Peruvian economist and politician, Lima City councilman (1984–1989) and director of BCRP (2001–2006).
- Rolf Gerber, 93, Swiss Olympic bobsledder (1956).
- Sneja Gunew, 77, Australian-Canadian literary theorist.
- Georgy Gushchenko, 92, Russian Olympic rower (1952, 1956).
- Duncan Hales, 76, New Zealand rugby union player (Canterbury, Manawatu, national team).
- Dorothea Hooper, 91, American politician, member of the New Hampshire House of Representatives (2010–2014).
- Bill Iffrig, 89, American marathon runner.
- Frans Janssens, 78, Belgian footballer (Lierse, national team).
- W. Lloyd Johns, 93, American politician.
- Benton Johnson, 95, American sociologist.
- Mark Kharitonov, 86, Russian novelist, poet and translator.
- Shahla Lahiji, 81, Iranian writer.
- Harry Lee, 83, American medical doctor and shell collector, complications from a stroke.
- Mar Mar Aye, 81, Burmese singer and actress.
- Johanna Meehan, 67, American philosopher and academic.
- Gene Merlino, 95, American singer.
- Roy Moultrie, 91, American politician, member of the Georgia House of Representatives (1985–1993).
- Alexio Churu Muchabaiwa, 84, Zimbabwean Roman Catholic prelate, bishop of Mutare (1982–2016).
- Héctor Murguía Lardizábal, 70, Mexican politician, MP (1994–2012) and mayor of Ciudad Juárez (2004–2007, 2010–2013).
- Nguyễn Bảo Trị, 94, Vietnamese army officer.
- Phill Niblock, 90, American composer, filmmaker and videographer, heart failure.
- Deanna Petherbridge, 84, South African-British artist, writer and curator.
- Ventura Pons, 78, Spanish film director (Ocaña, an Intermittent Portrait, Anita Takes a Chance, Food of Love).
- Gian Franco Reverberi, 89, Italian composer (Django, Prepare a Coffin, A Black Veil for Lisa, Cry Chicago) and musician.
- Immo Rittmeyer, 88, German Olympic cyclist (1964).
- Richard Rosenfeld, 75, American criminologist.
- J. B. Schneewind, 93, American scholar.
- Bohdan Shershun, 42, Ukrainian footballer (Dnipro Dnipropetrovsk, CSKA Moscow, national team).
- Wissam al-Tawil, 53–54, Lebanese militant, senior commander of Hezbollah, airstrike.
- Ezo Ukandu, 87, Nigerian traditional ruler.
- Denis Walker, 90, British-Zimbabwean politician, member of the Parliament of Rhodesia (1974–1981).
- Reggie Wells, 76, American makeup artist (The Oprah Winfrey Show).
- Leon Wildes, 90, American lawyer, stroke.
- J. P. R. Williams, 74, Welsh rugby union player (Barbarians, British & Irish Lions, national team), bacterial meningitis.
- Raymond Zane, 84, American politician, member of the New Jersey Senate (1974–2002).

=== 9 ===
- Marthe Bacal, 92, Romanian-born French plasma physicist.
- Ali Hussein Barji, Lebanese militant, airstrike.
- Miklós Benedek, 77, Hungarian actor (Soldiers of Freedom, Free Fall) and theater director.
- Jean Céa, 91, French mathematician.
- Agnes Chigabatia, 67, Ghanaian politician, MP (2005–2009).
- Choi Hong-suk, 35, South Korean volleyball player (Seoul Woori Card Wibee, national team).
- Bernard Cecil Cohen, 97, American political scientist and academic administrator, acting chancellor of University of Wisconsin–Madison (1987).
- Thierry Desmarest, 78, French businessman (TotalEnergies), complications from Alzheimer's disease.
- Edward Jay Epstein, 88, American investigative journalist and professor, complications from COVID-19.
- Diego Gallardo, 31, Ecuadorian singer-songwriter, shot.
- Leonard Glick, 94, American anthropologist and historian.
- Michael Z. Gordon, 82, American film producer and screenwriter.
- Frédéric Guirma, 92, Burkinabé diplomat, writer, and politician.
- Tadeusz Isakowicz-Zaleski, 67, Polish Roman Catholic priest and political dissident, cancer.
- Karel Janovický, 93, Czech-born British composer, pianist and radio producer (BBC World Service).
- Rashid Khan, 55, Indian Hindustani classical musician, prostate cancer.
- Amalija Knavs, 78, Slovene-American textile pattern maker.
- James Kottak, 61, American drummer (Scorpions, Kingdom Come, Kottak).
- Philippe Fanoko Kpodzro, 93, Togolese Roman Catholic prelate and politician, bishop of Atakpamé (1976–1992), archbishop of Lomé (1992–2007) and president of the National Assembly (1991–1994).
- Lo Siaw Ging, 89, Indonesian medical doctor.
- Santiago López Valdivielso, 73, Spanish politician and businessman, director-general of the Civil Guard (1996–2004) and deputy (1986–1996).
- Vazgen Manasyan, 65, Tajik football player (Pamir Dushanbe, Vorskla Poltava, national team) and manager.
- Robert Nemeček, 74, Serbian musician (Rok Mašina, Pop Mašina, Dogovor iz 1804.).
- Jaroslav Pavlů, 87, Czech ice hockey player (HC Škoda Plzeň, HC Kometa Brno, HC Bolzano) and head coach.
- Ira Reiss, 98, American sociologist.
- Letha Dawson Scanzoni, 88, American writer and scholar.
- Digby Smith, 89, British military historian.
- Elke Solomon, 80, American interdisciplinary artist, curator, and educator.
- Aronia Wilson Tambo, 64, Mexican politician, murder.
- Kai Wiedenhöfer, 57, German photojournalist, heart attack.

=== 10 ===
- César Alierta, 78, Spanish telecommunications executive, CEO of Telefónica (2000–2016), respiratory failure.
- Walmir Amaral, 84, Brazilian comic artist (The Phantom).
- Marat Baglai, 92, Russian jurist, judge (1995–2003) and president (1997–2003) of the Constitutional Court.
- Roy Battersby, 87, British television director (Between the Lines, A Touch of Frost, Cracker).
- Sir Anthony Battishill, 86, British civil servant, chairman of the Board of Inland Revenue (1986–1997).
- Terry Bisson, 81, American science fiction author ("Bears Discover Fire", "They're Made Out of Meat").
- Audie Blaylock, 61, American bluegrass singer and guitarist.
- Ian Boyd, 88, Canadian Roman Catholic priest and academic, founder of the Chesterton Review.
- Nancy Boyle, 91, Australian sprinter.
- Arnold Caplan, 82, American scientist.
- Marc Chavannes, 77, Dutch journalist and media studies academic (University of Groningen).
- Sir John Conant, 2nd Baronet, 100, British aristocrat.
- Peter Crombie, 71, American actor (Seinfeld, Se7en, My Dog Skip).
- Sushree Devi, 73, Indian politician, MP (2002–2008) and Odisha MLA (1990–1995).
- Bob Eberle, 89, American politician, member of the Washington House of Representatives (1963–1964, 1979–1983).
- Velle Espeland, 78, Norwegian folklorist.
- Tisa Farrow, 72, American actress (Homer, Zombi 2, Antropophagus).
- Jean Forest, 97, Canadian politician, senator (1996–1998).
- Sergio García Ramírez, 85, Mexican jurist and politician, attorney general (1982–1988) and secretary of labor and social welfare (1981–1982), president of the Inter-American Court of Human Rights (2004–2007).
- Paul Günter, 80, Swiss doctor and politician, MP (1979–1991, 1995–2007).
- Shamim Jairajpuri, 81, Indian zoologist.
- Jennell Jaquays, 67, American game designer (Dungeons & Dragons) and video game artist (Pac-Man, Donkey Kong), complications from Guillain–Barré syndrome.
- Peter Johnson, 84, English food industry and football executive, chairman of Tranmere Rovers (1987–1998, 2000–2014) and Everton (1994–1999).
- Franz Kurzmeyer, 88, Swiss judge and politician, mayor of Lucerne (1984–1996).
- Louis Le Pensec, 87, French politician, minister of agriculture (1997–1998) and senator (1998–2008).
- Janusz Majewski, 92, Polish film director (Lokis, An Epitaph for Barbara Radziwill, Hotel Pacific) and screenwriter.
- Tamara Milashkina, 89, Russian operatic soprano (Bolshoi Theatre).
- Nono Monzuluku, 64, Congolese composer and musician.
- Ignacy Nowak, 74, Polish chess player.
- Conrad Palmisano, 75, American stuntman (Batman Forever, Weekend at Bernie's, 21 Jump Street).
- Paul Rambali, 66, British rock critic and writer, prostate cancer.
- Peter H. Russell, 91, Canadian political scientist.
- Richard T. Schlosberg, 79, American business leader (Corpus Christi Caller-Times, The Denver Post, Los Angeles Times), brain cancer.
- Tom Tait, 86, American volleyball coach.
- Tian Zengpei, 93, Chinese diplomat and politician, ambassador to Yugoslavia (1986–1988) and chairperson of the committee of Foreign Affairs (1998–2003).

=== 11 ===
- Roberto Abugattás, 80, Peruvian Olympic high jumper (1964, 1968).
- Fariyar Aminipour, 23, Iranian Muay Thai fighter, traffic collision.
- Laurence Badie, 95, French actress (The Virtuous Scoundrel, Woman Times Seven, Bankers Also Have Souls) and comedian.
- John Barnes Jr., 92, American politician, member of the New Hampshire House of Representatives (1988–1992) and senate (1992–1998, 2000–2012).
- Ted Blunt, 80, American politician.
- Mel Blyth, 79, English footballer (Crystal Palace, Southampton, Millwall).
- Michele Bonatesta, 81, Italian journalist and politician, senator (1996–2006).
- Ed Broadbent, 87, Canadian politician, MP (1968–1990, 2004–2006).
- Robin Brownlee, 65, Canadian journalist (Edmonton Journal, Edmonton Sun) and radio host (TSN 1260).
- Khalid Butt, 76, Pakistani actor (Shah, Rahm, Motorcycle Girl) and film producer, kidney and liver disease.
- John V. Byrne, 95, American marine geologist and academic, administrator of the National Oceanic and Atmospheric Administration (1981–1984) and president of Oregon State University (1984–1995).
- Eckhard Deterding, 75, German football player (Werder Bremen, Hannover 96) and manager.
- Fabio De Felice, 96, Italian politician, deputy (1953–1958).
- April Ferry, 91, American costume designer (Maverick, Big Trouble in Little China, Rome).
- Dana Ghia, 91, Italian actress (Seven Deaths in the Cat's Eye, Free Hand for a Tough Cop, California) and singer.
- Per Grieg, 91, Norwegian businessman and ship broker.
- Bud Harrelson, 79, American baseball player (New York Mets, Philadelphia Phillies, Texas Rangers), complications from Alzheimer's disease.
- Guy Janvier, 75, French politician, member of the general council of Hauts-de-Seine (2004–2015).
- Kim Kyong-ok, 93, North Korean military officer, deputy (1998–2003) and member of the central military commission (2010–2021).
- Jean-Luc Laurent, 66, French politician, MP (2012–2017) and mayor of Le Kremlin-Bicêtre (1995–2016, since 2020).
- Ross Lightfoot, 87, Australian politician, senator (1997–2008).
- Dyson Lovell, 87, British film producer (The Cotton Club, Hamlet) and actor (Romeo and Juliet), cancer.
- Lynne Marta, 78, American actress (Joe Kidd, Footloose, Love, American Style), brain cancer.
- Salvatore Mazzarano, 58, Italian footballer (Taranto, Fasano, AC Ancona).
- Annie Nightingale, 83, English radio and television broadcaster (BBC Radio 1).
- Peter Ørebech, 75, Norwegian legal scholar and politician, MP (2009–2013).
- Miriam Noemí Ríos, 38–39, Mexican politician and human rights activist, shot.
- Mohamed Said, 36, Swedish actor (Andra Avenyn).
- Sigi Schwab, 83, German guitarist.
- John Short, 86, Canadian journalist (Edmonton Sun, Edmonton Journal) and broadcaster.
- Yury Solomin, 88, Russian actor (An Ordinary Miracle, Dersu Uzala, Die Fledermaus), complications from a stroke.
- Mike Taylor, 56, American music executive, cancer.
- Ruth Ashton Taylor, 101, American television journalist (KCBS-TV).
- Agustín Téllez Cruces, 105, Mexican politician, interim governor of Guanajuato (1984–1985), justice (1974–1982) and president (1977–1982) of the Supreme Court of Justice of the Nation.
- Bram Tuinzing, 75, Dutch Olympic rower (1972), surgeon, and professor.
- Zhang Kehui, 95, Chinese politician, vice chairman of the CPPCC (1998–2008).

=== 12 ===
- Nagham Abu Samra, 24, Palestinian karateka, airstrike.
- Amir Bhatia, Baron Bhatia, 91, British businessman and life peer, member of the House of Lords (2001–2023).
- Glenn Black, British English literature scholar.
- Bev Dovey, 85, English rugby union player (Bristol, national team).
- Falbrav, 25, Irish racehorse.
- Claire Waters Ferguson, 88, American figure skating judge, president of the U.S. Figure Skating Association (1992–1995).
- Bill Gairdner, 83, Canadian Olympic track and field athlete (1964).
- Richard Gambino, 84, American author and educator.
- Bill Hayes, 98, American singer ("The Ballad of Davy Crockett") and actor (Days of Our Lives, The Cardinal).
- Robin Herbert, 89, British banker and horticulturist.
- Hans Huber, 90, German boxer, Olympic silver medallist (1964).
- David L. Huestis, 77, American physicist.
- James D. Hughes, 101, American Air Force lieutenant general.
- František Janouch, 92, Czech nuclear physicist and dissident.
- Eric Krönmark, 92, Swedish politician, minister of defence (1976–1978, 1979–1981), governor of Kalmar County (1981–1996).
- Francis F. Lee, 96, Chinese-American inventor, businessman and academic, renal failure.
- Jacques Lefèvre, 95, French fencer, Olympic bronze medallist (1952).
- Gonzalo Lira, 55, Chilean-American writer, YouTuber, and blogger.
- Marek Litewka, 75, Polish actor (Camera Buff, The Constant Factor).
- Luis, 77, Spanish footballer (Deportivo La Coruña, Getafe Deportivo).
- David Lumsdaine, 92, Australian composer.
- Pierre Mailloux, 74, Canadian psychiatrist.
- Azzedine Meguellatti, 63, French football manager (Istres, Red Star, Racing Club).
- Millán Millán, 82–83, Spanish environmental scientist.
- Alec Musser, 50, American actor (All My Children) and model (Abercrombie & Fitch), suicide by gunshot.
- Sekou Odinga, 79, American activist.
- John Red Eagle, 75, American politician, principal chief (2010–2014) and assistant chief (2006–2010) of the Osage Nation.
- Stan Shaver, 75, American politician, member of the West Virginia House of Delegates (2001–2005, 2007–2012).
- Jimmy Somers, 84, Irish trade unionist, president of SIPTU (1997–1999).
- Haruo Takahashi, 76, Japanese animator (Inspector Gadget, Tiger Mask, GeGeGe no Kitarō).
- Wolfgang Wickler, 92, German zoologist and author.
- Gennady Yakovlev, 85, Russian botanist, pharmacognosist, and phytochemist.
- Telman Zeynalov, 92, Azerbaijani sculptor.

=== 13 ===
- Abdullah CD, 100, Malaysian politician and paramilitary leader, commander of the 10th Malay Regiment (1949–1989).
- Prabha Atre, 91, Indian classical vocalist.
- Art Baker, 94, American football coach (Furman Paladins, The Citadel Bulldogs, East Carolina Pirates).
- Miguel Barroso Ayats, 70, Spanish journalist (El País) and political advisor, secretary of state for press (2004–2005), heart attack.
- Jean-Jacques Bénètière, 84, French agronomic engineer and politician, deputy (1981–1986).
- Glen Cochrane, 65, Canadian ice hockey player (Philadelphia Flyers, Vancouver Canucks, Chicago Blackhawks), cancer.
- Keith Davies, 90, English footballer (Tranmere Rovers).
- Bernard Descôteaux, 77, Canadian journalist (Le Devoir).
- Bruno Ducol, 74, French pianist and composer.
- Mehmet Eymür, 80, Turkish intelligence official.
- Edemar Cid Ferreira, 80, Brazilian economist, banker, and art collector, heart attack.
- Tony Formosa, 86, Maltese football manager (national team, Valletta, Floriana).
- Larry E. Haines, 85, American politician, member of the Maryland Senate (1991–2011).
- David Hansen, 65, Australian art historian.
- Inga Hedberg, 96, Swedish botanist and academic.
- Jana Hlaváčová, 85, Czech actress (Operace Silver A, Angel of the Lord, The Dance Teacher).
- Christopher Hobbs, 82, British production designer (Mansfield Park).
- Finn Johannesson, 80, Swedish Olympic gymnast (1968).
- Spiros Kaloudis, 88, Greek lawyer and politician, MP (1981–1996).
- Moe L'Abbé, 76, Canadian ice hockey player (Chicago Blackhawks).
- Stephen Laybutt, 46, Australian footballer (Gent, Newcastle Jets, national team), suicide.
- Marnia Lazreg, 83, Algerian academic and feminist.
- Ernesto Martens, 90, Mexican chemical engineer, secretary of energy (2000–2003).
- Juli Mira, 74, Spanish actor (The Sea, Voices in the Night, The 7th Day).
- Sir Patrick Moberly, 95, British diplomat, ambassador to Israel (1981–1984) and South Africa (1984–1987).
- Christopher Moriarty, 87–88, Irish ichthyologist.
- Enzo Moscato, 75, Italian playwright, actor (Libera, The Vesuvians, The Remains of Nothing) and stage director.
- Bertin Ollé Ollé, 62, Cameroonian footballer (Tonnerre, Racing Bafoussam, national team).
- Colin Murray Parkes, 95, British psychiatrist.
- Ran Poliakine, 56, Israeli wireless power industry executive, founder of Powermat Technologies.
- Joyce Randolph, 99, American actress (The Honeymooners).
- Charles Robins, 88, English cricket player and administrator (Middlesex).
- Sigi Rothemund, 79, German film director (Timm Thaler).
- Laureano Rubial, 76, Spanish footballer (Real Zaragoza, Pontevedra, UP Langreo).
- Tom Shales, 79, American writer and television critic (The Washington Post), Pulitzer Prize winner (1988), COVID-19 and renal failure.
- Jo-El Sonnier, 77, American singer-songwriter and accordionist, Grammy winner (2015).
- Ladislav Svoboda, 85, Czech medical doctor (Rytíři Kladno) and politician, senator (1996–2008).
- Gagik Tadevosyan, 73, Armenian engineer and politician, MP (1995–2003).
- John Taylor, 84, British rugby league footballer (Hull KR, Castleford Tigers, national team).
- Romuald Twardowski, 93, Polish composer, organist and academic teacher (Warsaw State Academy of Music).
- Joseph Zadroga, 76, American 9/11 survivor advocate, traffic collision.
- Shaukat Zaidi, 72, Pakistani actor (Hum Sub Umeed Se Hain), journalist and playwright, kidney disease.

=== 14 ===
- Malcolm Alker, 45, English rugby league player (Salford Red Devils, national team), multiple organ failure.
- Ricardo Alós, 92, Spanish footballer (Sporting de Gijón, Valencia, Real Murcia).
- Brian Barczyk, 54, American snake collector and YouTuber, pancreatic cancer.
- Piero Betello, 89, Italian footballer (Roma, Palermo, Napoli).
- John Bingley, 82, Australian footballer (St Kilda).
- Christophe Boesch, 72, French-Swiss primatologist.
- Emilio Casalini, 82, Italian road racing cyclist.
- Dominick Cirillo, 94, American mobster (Genovese crime family).
- Jerry Coker, 91, American jazz saxophonist.
- Denis Connaghan, 79, Scottish footballer (Celtic, St Mirren, Morton).
- Joan Coxsedge, 93, Australian artist, activist, and politician, member of the Victorian Legislative Council (1979–1992).
- Margaret Crosland, 84, Canadian figure skater, multiple system atrophy.
- Mo Henry, 67, American film negative cutter (The Matrix, The Dark Knight, Heat), complications from liver failure.
- Jerry Hilgenberg, 92, American football player (Iowa Hawkeyes).
- Tom Johnson, 55, American television writer (The Daily Show, Lopez Tonight, The Jeselnik Offensive), Emmy winner (2001, 2003).
- Alan Jones, 83, American Episcopal priest, dean of Grace Cathedral, San Francisco (1985–2009).
- Ian Knox, 90, Australian admiral.
- Lutz Lischka, 79, Austrian Olympic judoka (1972).
- Douglas Mackintosh, 92, British Olympic alpine skier (1956).
- Carvin Malone, 64, British Virgin Islands politician, brain aneurysm.
- Martin McCallum, 73, British theatre producer.
- T. H. Musthafa, 82, Indian politician, Kerala MLA (1977–1995, 2001–2006).
- Yuichi Ogawa, 77, Japanese politician, MP (2005–2009).
- Karl-Heinz Ohlig, 85, German theologian.
- Magda Paulányi, 78, Hungarian Olympic javelin thrower (1972).
- Lakshmi Persaud, 86, Trinidadian writer.
- Tom Purdom, 87, American writer (Romance on Four Worlds).
- Munawwar Rana, 71, Indian poet, throat cancer.
- Lev Rubinstein, 76, Russian poet, essayist, and social activist, complications from a traffic collision.
- Raema Lisa Rumbewas, 43, Indonesian weightlifter, Olympic silver medallist (2000, 2004).
- Bob Rusch, 80, American jazz critic and record producer.
- Anthony Russell-Roberts, 79, British businessman and opera manager, cancer.
- Norm Snead, 84, American football player (Philadelphia Eagles, Minnesota Vikings, New York Giants).
- Makoto Taniguchi, 93, Japanese diplomat and academic, heart failure.
- Luís Torras, 111, Spanish painter.
- Elisabeth Trissenaar, 79, Austrian actress (Angry Harvest, The Stationmaster's Wife, Mario and the Magician).
- Howard Waldrop, 77, American science fiction author (Them Bones, A Dozen Tough Jobs, The Texas-Israeli War: 1999), stroke.
- Lizzie Wanyoike, 72, Kenyan educator and philanthropist, cancer.

=== 15 ===
- Charmian Abrahams, 96, British actress (Crossroads), traffic collision.
- Don Arnold, 81, American politician, member of the Tennessee Senate (1987–1991), mayor of Johnson City (1977–1978).
- Georgios Darivas, 97, Greek football player (Olympiacos, national team) and manager (Olympiacos).
- Nancy Deloye Fitzroy, 96, American engineer.
- Tatyana Frunze, 103, Russian organic chemist and professor.
- Jorge Griffa, 88, Argentine footballer (Newell's Old Boys, Atlético Madrid, national team).
- Klaas de Groot, 83, Dutch bioengineer.
- Reid Harrison, 65, American television producer and writer (The Simpsons, Men Behaving Badly, Danger Mouse).
- Hava Inbar, Polish-born Israeli military judge. (death announced on this date)
- K. J. Joy, 77, Indian composer.
- Dror Kashtan, 79, Israeli football player (Hapoel Petah Tikva, national team) and manager (national team).
- Roman Korban, 96, Polish Olympic middle-distance runner (1952).
- Karim Mojtahedi, 93, Iranian philosopher, stroke.
- William O'Connell, 94, American actor (The Outlaw Josey Wales, Every Which Way but Loose, Paint Your Wagon).
- Uno Palu, 90, Estonian Olympic decathlete (1956).
- Viola Plummer, 86, American community organizer and activist.
- Ronald Powell, 32, American football player (New Orleans Saints, Seattle Seahawks).
- Jožica Puhar, 81, Slovene sociologist and politician. (death announced on this date)
- James Masih Shera, 77, Pakistani-born British politician and educationist.
- Shih Ming-teh, 83, Taiwanese politician, MP (1993–2002).
- Ronnie Shikapwasha, 76, Zambian politician, minister of foreign affairs (2005–2006) and minister of information and broadcasting services (2008–2011), shot.
- Brent Sikkema, 75, American art dealer, stabbed.
- Anita Sirgo, 93, Spanish trade unionist and anti-Francoist militant (Asturian miners' strike of 1962).
- Ron Suster, 81, American jurist and politician, member of the Ohio House of Representatives (1981–1995).
- Mircea Tutovan-Codoi, 71, Romanian Olympic volleyball player (1972).
- Nerene Virgin, 77, Canadian journalist, educator and actress (Today's Special).
- Helmut Willke, 78, German sociologist.
- Gavin Woods, 75–76, South African politician, MP (1994–2009), cancer.
- Richard L. Zusi, 93, American ornithologist.

=== 16 ===
- José Agustín, 79, Mexican novelist (La tumba, De perfil, Ciudades desiertas), short-story writer, and essayist.
- Baby Sandy, 86, American child actress (Sandy Is a Lady, Sandy Gets Her Man, Bachelor Daddy).
- Jean-Baptiste Bokam, 72, Cameroonian politician.
- Don Catlin, 85, American anti-doping scientist, stroke.
- Zevulun Charlop, 94, American rabbi.
- Ottavio Dazzan, 66, Argentine-born Italian Olympic cyclist (1980).
- Joseph Delahunty, 88, American politician.
- Ervin Dér, 68, Hungarian Olympic cyclist (1980).
- Claire Fagin, 97, American nurse and academic administrator, interim president of the University of Pennsylvania (1993–1994).
- Hans Feurer, 84, Swiss fashion photographer.
- Alyce Frank, 91, American painter.
- David Gail, 58, American actor (Port Charles, Beverly Hills, 90210, Savannah), heart failure.
- Ajit Singh Gill, 95, Singaporean Olympic field hockey player (1956).
- Dzintra Grundmane, 79, Latvian basketball player (TTT Riga).
- Bernard Hartze, 73, South African footballer (Orlando Pirates, Cape Town Spurs, Hellenic).
- Johnny Jeter, 79, American baseball player (Pittsburgh Pirates, San Diego Padres, Chicago White Sox).
- Laurie Johnson, 96, English composer (The Avengers, Dr. Strangelove, First Men in the Moon) and bandleader.
- José Lifante, 80, Spanish actor (Spanish Fly, Butterfly on the Shoulder, National Heritage), blood clot.
- Milan Nenadić, 80, Serbian middleweight Greco-Roman wrestler, Olympic bronze medallist (1972).
- Philipp Sandner, 43, German economist and academic.
- Peter Schickele, 88, American composer and musical satirist (P. D. Q. Bach).
- Sergio Sebastiani, 92, Italian Roman Catholic cardinal, apostolic pro-nuncio to Madagascar (1976–1985) and Turkey (1985–1994), head of the Prefecture for the Economic Affairs of the Holy See (1997–2008).
- Valene L. Smith, 97, American anthropologist and geographer.
- K. B. Sreedevi, 83, Indian writer.
- Michael Sugrue, 66, American historian, prostate cancer.
- Lise Thiry, 102, Belgian scientist and politician.
- Vaino Väljas, 92, Estonian diplomat and politician, first secretary of the communist party (1988–1990).
- Jacob Wit, 71, Dutch jurist, judge of the Caribbean Court of Justice (2005–2023).
- Klaus Wunder, 73, German footballer (MSV Duisburg, Bayern Munich, 1972 Olympics).
- Lahcen Zinoun, 79, Moroccan choreographer (The Last Temptation of Christ, The Sheltering Sky, Joseph), cerebral hemorrhage.

=== 17 ===
- Shawn Barber, 29, Canadian-American Olympic pole vaulter (2016), world champion (2015).
- Aris Bouloukos, 91, Greek military officer and politician, MP (1977–1981, 1985–1989).
- Brian Brett, 73, Canadian poet, journalist (The Province, Yukon News), and novelist.
- Al Cantello, 92, American Olympic javelin thrower (1960).
- Leo Carlin, 86, American businessman (Philadelphia Eagles).
- Baldev Raj Chawla, 86, Indian politician, Punjab MLA.
- Günter Figal, 74, German philosopher.
- Benedict Fitzgerald, 74, American screenwriter (The Passion of the Christ, Wise Blood) and television consulting producer (Evil).
- Roger T. Forster, 90, British Christian theologian, founder of the Ichthus Christian Fellowship.
- Robert Gaylor, 93, American military officer, chief master sergeant of the Air Force (1977–1979).
- Anthony Gobert, 48, Australian motorcycle road racer.
- Knut Hjeltnes, 72, Norwegian Olympic discus thrower (1976, 1984, 1988).
- Don Ihde, 90, American philosopher.
- Al Kolyn, 91, Canadian politician, Ontario MPP (1981–1985).
- Mario Kontny, 70, German footballer (Werder Bremen).
- Serge Laprade, 83, Canadian singer and radio broadcaster, cancer.
- Sir Tony Lloyd, 73, British politician, MP (1983–2012, since 2017) and mayor of Greater Manchester (2015–2017), leukaemia.
- Hussein Madi, 85, Lebanese painter and sculptor.
- David L. Mills, 85, American computer scientist (Network Time Protocol).
- Dejan Milojević, 46, Serbian basketball player (Budućnost, Partizan) and coach (Golden State Warriors), heart attack.
- Paul Morton, 85, Canadian television executive.
- Bennie Muller, 85, Dutch footballer (Ajax, national team).
- Harriet Mitchell Murphy, 96, American judge.
- Carlos Rojas Gutiérrez, 69, Mexican politician and engineer, senator (2000–2006) and secretary of social development (1993–1998).
- Sir Colin Shepherd, 86, British politician, MP (1974–1997).
- Alex South, 93, English footballer (Liverpool, Halifax Town).
- Toni Stern, 79, American musician and lyricist ("It's Too Late").
- César Suárez, 38, Ecuadorian prosecutor (TC Televisión newsroom takeover), shot.
- Trini Tinturé, 88, Spanish cartoonist and illustrator.
- Gerd Uecker, 77, German music pedagogue, music and opera artistic director (Bavarian State Opera, Semperoper).
- Jaakko Valtanen, 98, Finnish general, chief of defence (1983–1990).
- Katherine Wallman, 80, American statistician.
- Mark Woyongo, 77, Ghanaian politician, MP (2013–2017), minister for defence (2013–2014) and the interior (2014–2017).

=== 18 ===
- Donald Adamson, 84, British literary scholar, philosopher and historian.
- Ted Allsopp, 97, Australian Olympic race walker (1956, 1964).
- Jean Joseph Benoit, 91, Canadian soldier and doctor, surgeon general (1990–1992).
- Katelele Ching'oma, 32, Malawian musician, liver damage.
- André Danthine, 91, Belgian computer scientist.
- Seán Dineen, 79, Irish mathematician.
- Hartmut Elsenhans, 82, German political scientist.
- Robin Fox, 89, British-American anthropologist.
- Mohamed Ghozzi, 74, Tunisian poet and literary critic.
- Giovanni Giudici, 83, Italian Roman Catholic prelate, auxiliary bishop of Milan (1990–2003) and bishop of Pavia (2003–2015).
- Gerry Gossens, 90, American politician, member of the Vermont House of Representatives (1993–1997) and Senate (2001–2005).
- Grated Coconut, 27, Canadian hall of fame rodeo bucking horse. (death announced on this date)
- Harry Greenway, 89, British politician, MP (1979–1997).
- Orietta Grossi, 64, Italian Olympic basketball player (1980).
- Josef Haas, 86, Swiss cross-country skier, Olympic bronze medallist (1968).
- Ray Henderson, 86, English footballer (Hull City, Reading).
- John Hurst, 76, English footballer (Everton, Oldham Athletic).
- Mick Ives, 84, English racing cyclist.
- Lena Derriecott Bell King, 100, American army corporal.
- Marica Mikulová, 72, Slovak puppeteer and theatre director.
- Alan Mills, 88, English tennis player and official, referee for Wimbledon Championships (1983–2005).
- Ivan Moody, 59, British composer and musicologist.
- Ulf Norberg, 82, Swedish Olympic ski jumper (1968).
- Cecilia Ogwal, 77, Ugandan politician, MP (since 1996), cancer.
- Louise Petherbridge, 92, New Zealand theatre actor, director and producer.
- Slim Pezin, 78, French guitarist, arranger and conductor.
- Amnon Rubinstein, 92, Israeli politician, MK (1977–2002), minister of communications (1984–1987) and education (1993–1996).
- Silent Servant, 46, Guatemalan-born American techno DJ and producer, drug overdose.
- Violet Siwela, 67, South African politician, MP (since 2019), member (2005–2019) and speaker (2018–2019) of the Mpumalanga Provincial Legislature.
- The Soft Moon, 44, American musician, drug overdose.
- Susie Tennant, 61, American music promoter (Nirvana, Sonic Youth, Weezer), complications from frontotemporal dementia.
- Heinz Tesar, 84, Austrian architect.
- Giuseppe Ticli, 44, Italian footballer (Monza, Padova, Pro Patria).
- Nicola Trahan, 97, French Resistance member during World War II.
- Yogesh Vaidya, 77, Nepali singer.
- Romy Vitug, 86, Filipino cinematographer (Harvest Home, Sa Aking mga Kamay, Sa Pusod ng Dagat), blood cancer.
- Bernd Wegner, 81, German mathematician.
- Jan Zaanen, 66, Dutch theoretical physicist.

=== 19 ===
- Tawfic Abdel Jabbar, 17, Palestinian-American teenager, shot.
- Raymond Apple, 88, Australian-Israeli rabbi.
- Héctor Bidonde, 86, Argentine actor (La Rabona, Alma mía, Chile 672) and stage director.
- Sir Graham Bright, 81, British politician, MP (1979–1997) and Cambridgeshire police and crime commissioner (2012–2016).
- Jack Burke Jr., 100, American Hall of Fame golfer, PGA champion (1956), Masters champion (1956).
- Attilio Busseti, 90, Italian lawyer and politician, senator (1976–1983, 1987–1992).
- Judith Campisi, 75, American biochemist.
- Len Choules, 91, English footballer (Crystal Palace, Romford). (death announced on this date)
- Adele Clarke, 78, American sociologist.
- Graham S. Cowles, 92, British ornithologist and paleornithologist.
- Domenick DiCicco, 60, American politician, member of the New Jersey General Assembly (2010–2012).
- Mario E. Dorsonville, 63, Colombian-born American Roman Catholic prelate, auxiliary bishop of Washington (2015–2023) and bishop of Houma–Thibodaux (since 2023).
- Edwin Hancock, 67, British computer scientist, cancer.
- Rolv Hellesylt, 96, Norwegian judge, justice of the Supreme Court (1979–1997).
- Joan Holden, 85, American playwright (San Francisco Mime Troupe), cancer.
- Sonia Ilinskagia, 86, Greek-Russian writer, translator and professor.
- Erwin James, 66, English murderer and columnist (The Guardian).
- Jack Jennings, 104, British World War II veteran, last survivor of the Burma Death Railway.
- Gitano Jiménez, 71, Spanish boxer, European featherweight champion (1973–1975).
- ABilly S. Jones-Hennin, 81, American LGBT rights activist, complications from Parkinson's disease and spinal stenosis.
- Toru Kawashima, 53, Japanese footballer (Gamba Osaka, Tokushima Vortis).
- Georgi Kostov, 82, Bulgarian composer and politician, minister of culture (1995–1996), MP (1995–1997).
- Lance Larson, 83, American swimmer, Olympic champion (1960), pneumonia.
- Lee Doo-yong, 81, South Korean film director (The General in Red Robes, The Korean Connection, Mulleya Mulleya) and screenwriter, lung cancer.
- Martí, 68–69, Spanish comics artist, cancer.
- Martin Middlebrook, 91, English military historian and writer (The First Day on the Somme, The Battle of Hamburg, The Berlin Raids).
- Ewa Podleś, 71, Polish coloratura contralto singer.
- Marlena Shaw, 84, American singer ("It's Better than Walking Out", "California Soul").
- Pluto Shervington, 73, Jamaican reggae musician, pneumonia.
- Yves St-Denis, 60, Canadian politician, Quebec MNA (2014–2018), aneurysm.
- Red Swanson, 87, American baseball player (Pittsburgh Pirates).
- Doboom Tulku, 81, Tibetan-born Indian Buddhist scholar and writer.
- Mary Weiss, 75, American singer (The Shangri-Las), chronic obstructive pulmonary disease.
- Robert Whitman, 88, American artist.

=== 20 ===
- Henk van den Breemen, 82, Dutch military officer, chief of defence (1994–1998).
- Rudolph C. Cane, 89, American politician, member of the Maryland House of Delegates (1999–2015).
- Choe Thae-bok, 93, North Korean politician, chairman of the Supreme People's Assembly (1998–2019), heart attack.
- Francisco Ciatso, 48, American professional wrestler.
- Piedad Córdoba, 68, Colombian politician, deputy (1992–1994) and senator (1994–2005, 2006–2010), heart attack.
- Anne Edwards, 96, American writer.
- David Emge, 77, American actor (Dawn of the Dead, Basket Case 2, Hellmaster).
- Zoran Erić, 73, Serbian composer.
- Eleanor Fazan, 94, Kenyan-born British actress and choreographer (Willow, Hot Fuzz, The Ruling Class).
- Herbert Glejser, 86, Belgian economist.
- Bobby Greenough, 84, English rugby league player (Warrington Wolves, Lancashire, Great Britain national team).
- Nicholas Higham, 62, British mathematician.
- Maite Idirin, 80, Spanish singer.
- Norman Jewison, 97, Canadian film director (In the Heat of the Night, Fiddler on the Roof, Moonstruck).
- Abbas Jirari, 86, Moroccan writer.
- Charis Kostopoulos, 59, Greek singer-songwriter, cancer.
- Devaki Krishnan, 100, Malaysian politician.
- Bob Landsee, 59, American football player (Philadelphia Eagles) and coach (Green Bay Blizzard).
- William Charles Lee, 85, American lawyer and jurist, U.S. attorney (1970–1973) and judge of the U.S. District Court (since 1981) for the Northern District of Indiana.
- Eugeniusz Lerch, 84, Polish footballer (Ruch Chorzów, ROW 1964 Rybnik, Maribyrnong Polonia).
- Jayanarayan Mohanty, 72, Indian politician, Odisha MLA (1995–2004).
- Donal O'Grady, 96, Irish hurler (Tubber, Faughs, Clare).
- Anezi Okoro, 94, Nigerian author (One Week One Trouble).
- Sadegh Omidzadeh, Iranian intelligence officer (Quds Force), airstrike.
- Pietro Omodeo, 104, Italian biologist.
- Doug Padgett, 89, English cricketer (Yorkshire, national team).
- Abdu Ali Abdul Rahman, Yemeni diplomat.
- Mariano Ruiz-Esquide, 93, Chilean politician, senator (1990–2014).
- Anadi Charan Sahu, 83, Indian politician, MP (1977–1980).
- Nathaniel Fiennes, 21st Baron Saye and Sele, 103, British Army officer, businessman and hereditary peer, member of the House of Lords (1968–1999).
- John Tomlinson, Baron Tomlinson, 84, British politician, MP (1974–1979), MEP (1984–1999) and member of the House of Lords (since 1998).
- Gaby Vallejo Canedo, 82, Bolivian writer, heart attack.
- Ali Zia, 66, Pakistani cricket player and coach (Bangladesh national team).

=== 21 ===
- Nnorom Azuonye, 56, Nigerian poet and playwright.
- Sir Christopher Benson, 90, British chartered surveyor and company director, pulmonary fibrosis.
- Maciej Chojnacki, 81, Polish basketball player (Lech Poznań, national team).
- Marvin Elkind, 89, Canadian gangster.
- Maricet Espinosa, 34, Cuban Olympic judoka (2016), heart attack.
- Jon Franklin, 82, American science journalist (The Baltimore Sun), esophageal cancer.
- Perry Friedman, 55, American poker player, pancreatic cancer.
- Moktar Hasni, 71, Tunisian footballer (EM Mahdia, R.A.A. Louviéroise, national team).
- Eva Heir, 80, Norwegian politician, deputy MP (1989–1997).
- Thomas Hussey, 87, Irish politician, senator (1981–1992) and TD (1969–1981).
- Timothy Kraft, 82, American political consultant, White House Political Director (1978–1979).
- Dick O'Bree, 87, Australian footballer (Collingwood).
- Jesús Federico Reyes Heroles, 71, Mexican politician, secretary of energy (1995–1997) and ambassador to the United States (1997–2000).
- José A. Rodríguez Cruz, 62, Puerto Rican politician, mayor of Hatillo (2005–2022), kidney disease.
- Roger Rogerson, 83, Australian police officer and convicted murderer, ruptured brain aneurysm.
- Frances Manners, Duchess of Rutland, 86, British peeress.
- Dorvan Solberg, 89, American politician, member of the North Dakota House of Representatives (1999–2008).
- Si Spiegel, 99, American bomber pilot and artificial Christmas tree manufacturer.
- Steve Staggs, 72, American baseball player (Toronto Blue Jays, Oakland Athletics).
- Jerry Wampfler, 91, American football coach (Philadelphia Eagles, Green Bay Packers, Detroit Lions).
- Gus Wingfield, 97, American banker and politician, state auditor (1995–2003) and treasurer (2003–2007) of Arkansas, member of the Arkansas House of Representatives (1981–1995).
- Xiang Jingyuan, 89, Chinese major general.

=== 22 ===
- Turgʻun Azizov, 89, Uzbek actor (Maftuningman, Fiery Roads).
- Tommy Baldwin, 78, English footballer (Chelsea, Arsenal, Seattle Sounders).
- János Beszteri-Balogh, 85, Hungarian Olympic ice hockey player (1964).
- Ted Bloecher, 94, American ufologist (National Investigations Committee On Aerial Phenomena) and actor, co-founder of Civilian Saucer Intelligence.
- Derrick Bragg, 59, Canadian politician, Newfoundland and Labrador MHA (since 2015), tongue cancer.
- Antônio Henrique Cunha Bueno, 74, Brazilian politician, deputy (1975–2003), kidney failure.
- Pierre Chassigneux, 82, French businessman and government official, president of SANEF (2003–2011).
- Elizabeth Cosnett, 87, British hymnodist.
- Elke Erb, 85, German author.
- Keith Fraser, 86, American athlete and author.
- Jagdish Gandhi, 87, Indian educationist and politician, Uttar Pradesh MLA (1969–1974) and founder of City Montessori School, complications from a heart attack.
- Tony Gardiner, 76, British mathematician.
- Gary Graham, 73, American actor (Alien Nation, Star Trek: Enterprise, All the Right Moves), cardiac arrest.
- Eva Grant, 98, Turkish-born Greek-British glamour photographer.
- Han Song, 76, South Korean academic administrator, president of Gangneung–Wonju National University (2003–2011).
- Gabriela Hanuláková, 66, Slovak track and field athlete.
- Yahya Harahap, 89, Indonesian jurist, judge of the Supreme Court (1982–2000).
- Motohisa Ikeda, 83, Japanese politician.
- Jimmy Choux, 16, New Zealand racehorse, euthanized.
- Jay Kappraff, 86, American mathematician and author.
- Dexter King, 62, American civil rights activist, prostate cancer.
- Neil Kulkarni, 51, British music journalist (Melody Maker, The Quietus, Drowned in Sound).
- Don Lassetter, 90, American baseball player (St. Louis Cardinals).
- Lior Lubin, 46, Israeli basketball player (Ironi Ramat Gan, Maccabi Tel Aviv, Hapoel Tel Aviv) and coach, cancer.
- Richard Lucero, 88, American politician, mayor of Española, New Mexico (1968–1974, 1986–1994, 1998–2006).
- Pablo Lugo, 91, Puerto Rican Olympic boxer (1952).
- Bridget McEvilly, 77, British army nurse, matron-in-chief of the Queen Alexandra's Royal Army Nursing Corps (1999–2002).
- John McMahon, 91, Australian cricketer (Queensland).
- Mongolian Mauler, 62, American professional wrestler.
- Klaus Mosbach, 91, Swedish biochemist.
- Edwin Mullins, 90, British art critic and novelist.
- Gary V. Nelson, 70, Canadian urban missiologist.
- Jackie O'Gorman, 80, Irish hurler (Cratloe, Clare).
- Arno Allan Penzias, 90, American physicist and radio astronomer, Nobel Prize laureate (1978), complications from Alzheimer's disease.
- Anatoli Polivoda, 76, Ukrainian basketball player, Olympic champion (1972) and bronze medalist (1968).
- Darwin Prockop, 94, American biochemist.
- Gigi Riva, 79, Italian footballer (Cagliari, Legnano, national team), heart attack.
- Per Sønstabø, 82, Norwegian footballer (Vard, national team).
- James K. Styner, 89, American orthopedic surgeon.
- Andrzej Szajna, 74, Polish Olympic artistic gymnast (1972, 1976, 1980).
- János Toldi, 96, Hungarian Olympic sprint canoer.

=== 23 ===
- Jan Bogaert, 66, Belgian road racing cyclist.
- Bruce Covernton, 57, Canadian football player (Calgary Stampeders).
- George Doucet, 84, Canadian politician, member (1974–1978) and speaker (1977–1978) of the Nova Scotia House of Assembly.
- Frank Farian, 82, German singer, songwriter ("Rasputin") and record producer (Boney M., Milli Vanilli).
- Charles Fried, 88, American jurist and lawyer, solicitor general (1985–1989) and associate justice of the Massachusetts Supreme Judicial Court (1995–1999).
- Mohammad Ghobadlou, 23, Iranian political activist, executed.
- Ice Train, 56, American professional wrestler (CWA, WCW).
- David Kahn, 93, American historian, journalist, and writer (The Codebreakers).
- Lars Lefdal, 84, Norwegian politician, MP (1977–1989).
- Melanie, 76, American singer-songwriter ("Brand New Key", "Lay Down (Candles in the Rain)") and guitarist, Emmy winner (1989).
- Peg Moorhouse, 106, New Zealand weaver.
- Giuliano Musiello, 70, Italian footballer (Atalanta, Roma, Verona).
- Anayo Nnebe, 61, Nigerian politician, member of the Anambra State House of Assembly.
- René Oliveira, 68, American politician, member of the Texas House of Representatives (1981–1987, 1991–2019).
- Ali Orumian, 92, Iranian ayatollah, MP (1984–1988) and member of the Assembly of Experts (1990–2006).
- Charles Osgood, 91, American news anchor (CBS News Sunday Morning), complications from dementia.
- Jean Petit, 74, French football player (Monaco, national team) and manager.
- Jack Riddell, 92, Canadian politician, Ontario MPP (1973–1990) and minister of agriculture and food (1985–1989).
- Margaret Riley, 58, American film and television producer (Bombshell, Love & Other Drugs, Ratched), ovarian cancer.
- Anders Sandberg, 55, Swedish singer (Rednex).
- Margo Smith, 84, American singer ("Still a Woman"), complications from a stroke.
- Dick Traum, 83, American marathoner and businessman, founder of Achilles International.
- Romana Vaccaro, 67, Czech-German operatic soprano.

=== 24 ===
- Carl Andre, 88, American sculptor (Equivalent VIII, Lever).
- Troy Beckwith, 48, Australian actor (The Miraculous Mellops, Neighbours, Pugwall), cancer.
- Otto Theodor Benfey, 98, German-born American chemist and historian.
- Ann Bowers, 86, American business executive and philanthropist.
- Ivor Browne, 94, Irish psychiatrist.
- Frank Buck, 80, American politician, member of the Tennessee House of Representatives (1973–2009).
- Gilles Charpentier, 96, French politician, deputy (1981–1986).
- Conrad Chase, 58, American actor, singer and reality TV contestant (Gran Hermano).
- Gerry Collis, 93, American baseball player (Denver Bears, Hutchinson Elks) and college football coach (Bakersfield Renegades).
- Harry Connick Sr., 97, American attorney, district attorney of New Orleans (1973–2003).
- Herbert Coward, 85, American actor (Deliverance), traffic collision.
- Dai Yi, 97, Chinese historian.
- H. T. Dickinson, 84, British historian.
- Rick France, 85, British speedway rider.
- Howard Golden, 98, American lawyer and politician, borough president of Brooklyn (1977–2001).
- Malcolm Gregson, 80, English golfer, multiple organ failure.
- Rod Holcomb, 80, American television director (ER, The Greatest American Hero) and producer (The Six Million Dollar Man), Emmy winner (2009).
- Walt Houston, 91, American football player (Washington Redskins).
- Jesse Jane, 43, American pornographic actress (Pirates, Pirates II: Stagnetti's Revenge) and host (Naughty Amateur Home Videos), drug overdose. (body discovered on this date)
- Ayşe Işıl Karakaş, 65, Turkish academic and jurist, judge of the European Court of Human Rights (2008–2019).
- Kelly Malveaux, 47, American football player (Winnipeg Blue Bombers, Calgary Stampeders, Montreal Alouettes).
- Mattie McAuliffe, 94, Irish Gaelic footballer (Castlemagner, Macroom, Cork) and hurler.
- N. Scott Momaday, 89, American author (House Made of Dawn, The Way to Rainy Mountain, The Man Made of Words: Essays, Stories, Passages).
- Selwyn Muru, 86, New Zealand artist, broadcaster and writer.
- Cheryl Palm, 70, American agriculturalist, Creutzfeldt–Jakob disease.
- Sigmund R. Petersen, 87, Norwegian-born American NOAA Commissioned Corps admiral.
- Serhiy Rozhok, 38, Ukrainian footballer (Obolon Kyiv, Minsk, CSKA Kyiv), killed in action.
- Alberto Tanasini, 78, Italian Roman Catholic prelate, auxiliary bishop of Genoa (1996–2004) and bishop of Chiavari (2004–2021).
- Clyde Taylor, 92, American film scholar, writer and cultural critic.
- Gyula Tóth, 75, Hungarian schoolteacher and politician, MP (2002–2010).
- Väino Uibo, 81, Estonian actor (A Time to Live and a Time to Love) and politician, mayor of Elva (1993–1998).

=== 25 ===
- Bruno Amstad, 59–60, Swiss jazz singer, cancer.
- Bené Arnold, 88, American ballerina.
- Hari Shankar Bhabhra, 95, Indian politician, MP (1978–1984), speaker of the Rajasthan Legislative Assembly (1990–1994) and deputy chief minister of Rajasthan (1994–1998).
- Bhavatharini, 47, Indian singer, composer (Bharathi, Azhagai Irukkirai Bayamai Irukkirathu) and music director (Mitr, My Friend), liver cancer.
- Keith Booth, 81, English cricket writer.
- Pēteris Cimdiņš, 79, Latvian biologist and politician.
- Ger Connolly, 86, Irish politician, TD (1969–1997).
- Stanley Crawford, 86, American writer and farmer.
- Bat-Sheva Dagan, 98, Polish-Israeli Holocaust survivor, educator and author.
- Deodoro, 74, Brazilian footballer (Portuguesa, Clube Atlético Juventus, Coritiba), stroke.
- Roger Donlon, 89, American army officer, Medal of Honor recipient (1964).
- Milan Stanislav Ďurica, 98, Slovak historian and theologian.
- Piero Errani, 87, Italian Olympic sport shooter (1972, 1976).
- Amanda Hanson, 38, American journalist, complications from surgery.
- Rafiuddin Hashmi, 83, Pakistani poet and literary scholar.
- Michael Healy Lacayo, 61, Nicaraguan businessman and political dissident, president of the Superior Council for Private Enterprise (2020–2021), heart attack.
- Gus Hendrickson, 83, American college ice hockey player and coach (Minnesota Duluth Bulldogs).
- Jim McCanless, 88, American football player (Houston Oilers).
- Gerald McGinnis, 89, American inventor and businessman, founder of Respironics, complications from Parkinson's disease.
- Abasse Ndione, 77, Senegalese writer.
- Sanath Nishantha, 48, Sri Lankan politician, minister for water supply (2020–2022, since 2022) and MP (since 2015), traffic collision.
- Jean-Pierre Nonault, 86, Congolese politician and diplomat, senator (2002–2023).
- Park Jong-geun, 86, South Korean politician, MP (1996–2012).
- Kenneth Eugene Smith, 58, American convicted murderer, execution by nitrogen hypoxia.
- Klaus Thielmann, 89, German politician.
- Jean Vaillant, 91, French Olympic long-distance runner (1964).
- Jim Zockoll, 93, American-born English pilot and businessman.

=== 26 ===
- Josep Alegre i Vilas, 83, Spanish Roman Catholic monk, abbot of the Royal Abbey of Santa Maria de Poblet (1998–2015).
- Ron Anderson, 78, American singer.
- Hartmut Bagger, 85, German general.
- Becky Barrett, 81, American-born Canadian politician, Manitoba MLA (1990–2003), minister of labour and integration and multiculturalism (1999–2003).
- Kenneth Berns, 85, American virologist.
- Jiří Bičák, 82, Czech physicist and academic.
- Andreas Blum, 85, Swiss radio journalist and actor (Salto Mortale), director of Schweizer Radio DRS (1979–1999).
- Dean Brown, 68, American jazz guitarist, cancer.
- buZ blurr, 80, American artist and photographer.
- Emanuele Catarinicchia, 97, Italian Roman Catholic prelate, bishop of Cefalù (1978–1987) and Mazara del Vallo (1987–2002).
- David Conklin, 68, American ice sled hockey player, paralympic champion (2002).
- Davie Cooper, 84, Scottish trade unionist.
- Graham Drury, 71, Welsh motorcycle speedway rider.
- El Amry Farouk, 53, Egyptian businessman and politician, complications from brain surgery.
- Sukhbir Singh Gill, 48, Indian Olympic field hockey player (2000), brain tumour.
- Michel Hausser, 96, French jazz vibraphonist.
- John Hines, 87, American rancher and politician, member of the Wyoming House of Representatives (1985–2002) and Senate (2003–2015).
- Richard Howard, 79, British actor (Emmerdale Farm).
- Włodzimierz Jastrzębski, 84, Polish historian.
- Petri Koivisto, 37, Finnish ice hockey player (Kärpät, Espoo Blues).
- Gerrit van Kouwen, 60, Dutch racing driver.
- Iosif Lereter, 90, Romanian footballer (Politehnica Timișoara, UTA Arad, national team).
- Shigeichi Negishi, 100, Japanese engineer, inventor of the karaoke machine.
- Ricardo Pascale, 81, Uruguayan economist and sculptor, president of the Central Bank of Uruguay (1985–1990, 1995–1996).
- Goran Petrović, 62, Serbian writer, member of the Serbian Academy of Sciences and Arts.
- Michael Rogge, 94, Dutch photographer and videographer.
- Gordon Rogoff, 92, American theatre director, dramaturge and academic.
- Dick Waterman, 88, American writer, promoter and photographer.
- Michael Watford, 80, American dance music singer.
- Jimy Williams, 80, American baseball player (St. Louis Cardinals) and manager (Boston Red Sox, Toronto Blue Jays).
- Shiv Pratap Yadav, 72, Indian politician, four-time Uttar Pradesh MLA.

=== 27 ===
- Nitya Anand, 99, Indian pharmaceutical chemist, director of the Central Drug Research Institute (1974–1984).
- Annie Belle, 67, French actress (Laure, Blue Belle, Cross of the Seven Jewels) and social worker.
- Robert W. Bower, 87, American applied physicist.
- James Carine, 89, British rear admiral.
- John Connor, 79, Irish politician, TD (1981–1982, 1989–1997) and twice senator, traffic collision.
- Meir Daloya, 67, Israeli Olympic weightlifter.
- Robert Demontigny, 87, Canadian singer.
- Harmohan Dhawan, 83, Indian politician, MP (1989–1991) and minister of civil aviation (1990–1991).
- John Dodds, 80, Australian motorcycle road racer.
- Burt Elliott, 76, American politician, member of the South Dakota House of Representatives (2001–2008).
- Gerti Fesl, 92, Austrian Olympic gymnast.
- Ross Gelbspan, 84, American journalist, chronic obstructive pulmonary disease.
- Maria Giacobbe, 95, Italian-Danish writer.
- Peter Glynn, 71, English rugby league player (St. Helens, Salford, national team). (death announced on this date)
- Stuart Gray, 50, Scottish footballer (Celtic, Reading, Rushden & Diamonds), bile duct cancer.
- Barry Jenkins, 79, English drummer (The Animals).
- Norman J. Kansfield, 83, American minister and scholar, pneumonia.
- Enrique Liporace, 82, Argentine actor (Time for Revenge, Last Days of the Victim, Eva Perón: The True Story).
- Ricardo López, 86, Spanish-born Canadian politician, MP (1984–1993).
- Sreela Majumdar, 65, Indian actress (Damul, Ek Din Pratidin, Mandi), cancer.
- Rubén Marín, 89, Argentine politician, governor of La Pampa Province (1983–1987, 1991–2003), deputy (1987–1989) and twice senator, pneumonia.
- Neil Marks, 85, Australian cricketer (New South Wales).
- Pierre Montlaur, 60, French rugby union player (SU Agen, national team).
- Eugenio Nasarre, 77, Spanish politician and civil servant, director general of RTVE (1982) and deputy (2000–2015).
- Lillebjørn Nilsen, 73, Norwegian singer-songwriter and folk musician.
- Gogi Saroj Pal, 78, Indian painter and mixed media artist.
- Henryk Pytel, 68, Polish Olympic ice hockey player (1976, 1980, 1984).
- Bruno Segre, 105, Italian lawyer and partisan.
- Sheng Zhiyong, 103, Chinese burn surgeon.
- Susumu Taira, 89, Japanese actor (Nabbie's Love).
- Hamda Taryam Al Shamsi, 24, Emirati drag racer.
- Ahmad Mahfuz Umar, 87–88, Yemeni writer.
- Paul Vallone, 56, American politician, member of the New York City Council (2014–2021), heart attack.
- Sylvia Walton, 83, Australian academic administrator, chancellor of La Trobe University (2006–2011).
- L. W. Wright, 74, American confidence trickster, colon cancer.

=== 28 ===
- Nikolay Aksamit, 69, Belarusian artist and politician, member of the Supreme Council (1990–1996).
- Irma Anderson, 93, American politician, mayor of Richmond, California (2001–2006), complications from pancreatic cancer.
- Walter Ivan de Azevedo, 97, Brazilian Roman Catholic prelate, bishop of São Gabriel da Cachoeira (1986–2002).
- Barbara Jean Burns, 82, American academic.
- Marcelo Cecé, 88, Brazilian politician.
- Don Cheeks, 92, American politician, member of the Georgia State Senate (1992–2004), three-time member of the Georgia House of Representatives.
- Nancy B. Clark, 77, American philatelist, respiratory failure.
- Sir David Cooksey, 83, British businessman, venture capitalist and policy advisor, heart attack.
- Helen Corey, 100, American cookbook author.
- Egil Egebakken, 81, Norwegian artist.
- Ignacio Estrada, 77, American ventriloquist.
- Jim Furey, 91, American football player (BC Lions, Calgary Stampeders, New York Titans).
- John Henry Kreitler, 75, American composer.
- Birger Larsen, 81, Danish footballer (Boldklubben Frem, national team).
- Víctor Luna, 64, Colombian football player (Atlético Nacional, national team) and manager (Barcelona), heart attack.
- Cicerone Manolache, 87, Romanian football player (Politehnica Timișoara, national team) and manager (CARA Brazzaville).
- Marie Mansfield, 92, American baseball player (Rockford Peaches, Battle Creek Belles).
- Albert Mayr, 80, Italian composer.
- Abdul-Nabi Namazi, 75–76, Iranian Twelver Shia cleric and politician, prosecutor-general (2001–2004) and member of the Assembly of Experts (since 1990).
- Deirdre O'Connor, 82, Australian lawyer and jurist, judge of the Federal Court of Australia (1990–2002), president of the Administrative Appeals Tribunal (1990–1994, 1999–2002).
- Lenny Piper, 46, English footballer (Gillingham, St Albans City, Farnborough).
- Judith D. Sally, 86, American mathematician.
- David Smith, 88, English Anglican clergyman, bishop of Bradford (1992–2002).
- Marie-Josèphe Sublet, 87, French politician.
- Larry L. Taylor, 81, American military officer, Medal of Honor recipient, cancer.
- Luis Tejada, 41, Panamanian footballer (Juan Aurich, Universitario, national team), heart attack.
- Deborah Ann Turner, 73, American medical doctor, complications from a pulmonary embolism.

=== 29 ===
- Fernando Acevedo, 77, Peruvian Olympic sprinter (1968, 1972).
- Hinako Ashihara, 50, Japanese manga artist (Forbidden Dance, Sand Chronicles, Sexy Tanaka-san), suicide.
- Myrna L. Bair, 79, American politician, member of the Delaware Senate (1980–2000).
- Grace Boadu, Ghanaian herbal medicine practitioner, head injury.
- Joseph Brain, 84, American physiologist and academic.
- Hal Buell, 92, American photographer, pneumonia.
- Patrick Burke, 61, American professional golfer.
- Tony Cedras, 71, South African musician.
- R. Champakalakshmi, 91, Indian historian.
- Cho Gyeong-sik, 87, South Korean economist, academic, and politician, minister of environment (1990) and of agriculture, forestry, and fisheries (1990–1992).
- Louis Colombani, 92, French politician, deputy (1988–1997).
- Anthony Cordesman, 84, American national security analyst.
- Inger McCabe Elliott, 90, Norwegian-born American businesswoman, cardiac arrest.
- Lúcia Faria, 78, Brazilian Olympic equestrian (1968).
- Bud Fendler, 88, American politician.
- Séverine Foulon, 50, French middle-distance runner.
- Jan Graham, 74, American politician and attorney, Utah attorney general (1993–2001), primary peritoneal carcinoma.
- Brian Griffin, 75, British photographer.
- Samuel Pinheiro Guimarães, 84, Brazilian diplomat, secretary-general of foreign affairs (2003–2009).
- Arne Hegerfors, 81, Swedish sports journalist (SVT, Canal Plus), lung and pancreatic cancer.
- Ronnie Joyner, 64, American basketball player (Wellington Saints, Waikato Pistons, Northland Suns), bowel cancer.
- Satoshi Kirishima, 70, Japanese anarchist terrorist (1974 Mitsubishi Heavy Industries bombing).
- Blaine Lacher, 53, Canadian ice hockey player (Boston Bruins).
- Lawrence Langer, 94, American scholar, rectal cancer.
- Lee Jung-woo, 92, South Korean lawyer and politician, minister of justice (1992–1993).
- Delio Lucarelli, 84, Italian Roman Catholic prelate, bishop of Rieti (1997–2015).
- Alice Mackler, 92, American artist and painter, complications from COVID-19.
- Jandira Martini, 78, Brazilian actress (O Clone, América, Caminho das Índias), lung cancer.
- Sandra Milo, 90, Italian actress (8½, Juliet of the Spirits, Vanina Vanini), lung cancer.
- James Pierce, 60, American Paralympic wheelchair curler (2006, 2010).
- Hind Rajab, 6, Palestinian child, airstrike.
- P. Narsa Reddy, 92, Indian independence activist and politician, MP (1989–1991) and Andhra Pradesh MLA (1962–1978).
- Iskandar Safa, 68, Lebanese-born French shipbuilding industry executive, cancer.
- Héctor Sanabria, 78, Mexican football player (UNAM Pumas, national team) and manager (Toluca).
- Jim Sebesta, 88, American politician, member of the Florida Senate (1999–2006), complications from dementia.
- Ally Shewan, 83, Scottish football player (Aberdeen) and manager (Elgin City).

=== 30 ===
- Ahmed Baduri, 77, Eritrean diplomat and politician.
- György Barkó, 92, Hungarian actor (The Witman Boys, Mom and Other Loonies in the Family).
- Hinton Battle, 67, American actor (The Wiz, Dreamgirls, Miss Saigon) and dancer, Tony winner (1981, 1984, 1991).
- Achim Benning, 89, German actor and theater director.
- Donald Black, 82–83, American sociologist (University of Virginia).
- Rick Boland, 70, Canadian actor.
- Jean Carnahan, 90, American politician, member of the U.S. Senate (2001–2002), first lady of Missouri (1993–2000).
- Sir Geoffrey Chipperfield, 90, British civil servant.
- Jean-François Cordet, 73, French government official, director of OFPRA (2007–2012).
- Ellen Gilchrist, 88, American author, breast cancer.
- Mary-Annette Hay, 98, New Zealand wool promoter and watercolour painter.
- Stephen Keith, 81, American politician, member of the Kentucky House of Representatives (1985–1995).
- Tetsuo Kutsukake, 94, Japanese politician, chair of the National Public Safety Commission (2005–2006), heart failure.
- Melinda Ledbetter, 77, American talent manager (Brian Wilson).
- Reg Macey, 87, Australian politician, Victoria MLA (1985–1992).
- Peter McGuffin, 74, Northern Irish psychiatrist and geneticist.
- Roberto Melgrati, 76, Italian footballer (Como 1907, Perugia, Chiasso).
- Stephen Mitchell, 75, British historian and epigrapher.
- Vinod Neb, 81, Indian air force officer and pilot.
- Aziz Saleh Al-Numan, 82, Iraqi politician, minister of agriculture (1986–1991), governor of Kuwait (1991) and Najaf (1979–1986).
- Zdeněk Pecka, 69, Czech rower, Olympic bronze medalist (1976, 1980).
- Helmut Peuser, 83, German politician, member of the Landtag of Hesse (1995–2014).
- Chita Rivera, 91, American actress (West Side Story, Kiss of the Spider Woman, Chicago), Tony winner (1984, 1993).
- Jan de Rooy, 80, Dutch rally driver, winner of Dakar Rally (1987).
- Orazio Schena, 82, Italian footballer (Anderlecht, Liège, Tilleur-Saint-Nicolas).
- Richard H. Smith, 78, American politician, member of the Georgia House of Representatives (since 2005).
- Abe Terry, 89, English rugby league player (St Helens).
- Gerhard Tötemeyer, 88, Namibian politician, heart attack.
- Michael Trcic, 63, American sculptor and special effects artist (Jurassic Park, Terminator 2: Judgment Day, Batman Returns).
- Robert Wade, 93, Australian artist.
- Bognessan Arsène Yé, 66, Burkinabé politician, president of the National Assembly (1992–1997).

=== 31 ===
- Stan Aronoff, 91, American politician, member (1967–1996) and president (1989–1996) of the Ohio Senate.
- Anil Babar, 74, Indian politician, Maharashtra MLA (since 2019), pneumonia.
- Steve Barr, 72, American baseball player (Boston Red Sox, Texas Rangers).
- Terry Beasley, 73, American Hall of Fame college football player (Auburn Tigers, San Francisco 49ers), suicide.
- Paul Brett, 76, English rock guitarist, heart failure.
- Hank Cicalo, 91, American recording engineer (The Monkees, Carole King, Barbra Streisand).
- Manfred Cross, 94, Australian politician, MP (1961–1975, 1980–1990).
- Bill Cunningham, 91, Canadian television journalist.
- Michael Egan, 75, Australian politician, treasurer of New South Wales (1995–2005), member of the New South Wales Legislative Council (1986–2005).
- Leif Eriksen, 83, Norwegian footballer (Vålerenga, Eidsvold Turn, national team).
- John G. Heimann, 94, American government official, comptroller of the currency (1977–1981).
- Yitzhar Hofman, 36–37, Israeli soldier, shot.
- Rick Howe, 69, Canadian radio personality and writer.
- Abul Hashem Khan, 68, Bangladeshi politician, MP (2021–2024).
- Rehan Zeb Khan, Pakistani politician, shot.
- Anthony Lamb, 86, British botanist.
- Mario Levi, 66, Turkish writer.
- Joe Madison, 74, American radio talk-show host (SiriusXM Urban View, WOL-AM) and activist, prostate cancer.
- Al McBean, 85, American baseball player (Pittsburgh Pirates, Los Angeles Dodgers, San Diego Padres).
- Ivo Mosley, 72, British writer, poet and potter, dementia and motor neurone disease.
- Maria Musso, 92, Italian Olympic sprinter and pentathlete (1952, 1956).
- Amrus Natalsya, 90, Indonesian poet, painter and wood sculpture artist.
- Chuck Philips, 71, American journalist (Los Angeles Times). (death announced on this date)
- John Pregenzer, 91, American baseball player (San Francisco Giants).
- Ruth Shaw, 97, British politician, member of Greater London Council (1973–1977).
- Heinz Simmet, 79, German footballer (1. FC Köln, Rot-Weiss Essen, Borussia Neunkirchen).
- Alexey Spirin, 72, Russian football referee.
- Samiro Yunoki, 101, Japanese artist.
