= Han Song =

Han Song may refer to:

- Han Song (Han dynasty) (韓嵩; born 154), advisor during the late Eastern Han dynasty
- Han Song (academic) (한송; born 1947), South Korean academic
- Han Song (writer) (韩松; born 1965), Chinese state journalist and science fiction writer
- Han Song (politician)(韩松; born 1965), Chinese politician
