= Cosnett =

Cosnett is a surname. Notable people with the surname include:

- Elizabeth Joan Cosnett (born 1936), British hymnodist
- John Cosnett (1951–2018), British darts player
- Rick Cosnett (born 1983), Zimbabwean-Australian actor

== See also ==
- Consett
