= Fendler =

Fendler is a German surname. Notable people with the surname include:

- Augustus Fendler (1813–1883), Prussian-born American natural history collector
- Bud Fendler (1935-2024), American politician from Missouri
- Donn Fendler (1926–2016), American whose disappearance launched a manhunt
- Lothar Fendler (1913–1983), German SS officer and Holocaust perpetrator
