= Maciej Chojnacki =

Polish basketball player (1942–2024)

Personal information
- Born: 16 December 1942 Częstochowa, General Government (now Poland)
- Died: 21 January 2024 (aged 81)

Maciej Chojnacki (16 December 1942 – 21 January 2024) was a Polish basketball player, bronze medalist of the European Championships (1967), playing as a winger (193 cm tall).

== Sports career ==
Chojnacki was a player of Lech Poznań, he made his debut in the first league in the 1961–62 season and played until the 1972–73 season (best place: fifth in 1965, 1970, 1972 and 1973). In the years 1973–1976 he was a player of the Belgian team Waterloo, and in the 1976–77 season he played briefly in the second league Polonia Leszno. Then he was Wiktor Haglauer's assistant at Lech Poznań for a season and a half, He made his debut in the Polish national team in 1965, and his greatest success in his career was the bronze medal of the European Championships in 1967. He played in the red and white colors until 1969, in a total of 40 matches.

Chojnacki died on 21 January 2024, at the age of 81.
