= Spiros Kaloudis =

Greek lawyer and politician (1936–2024)

- Σπύρος Καλούδης

Member of the Hellenic Parliament for Corfu
- In office 1981–1996

Personal details
- Born: 1936 Argyrades, Greece
- Died: 13 January 2024 (aged 88)
- Party: Pasok
- Education: National and Kapodistrian University of Athens
- Occupation: Lawyer

Spiros Kaloudis (Greek: Σπύρος Καλούδης; 1936 – 13 January 2024) was a Greek lawyer and politician. A member of Pasok, he served in the Hellenic Parliament from 1981 to 1996.

Kaloudis died on 13 January 2024, at the age of 88.
