= Karsten Knolle =

German politician (1939–2024)

Member of the European Parliament
- In office 20 July 1999 – 19 July 2004
- Constituency: Germany

Personal details
- Born: 17 January 1939 Neinstedt, Germany
- Died: 3 January 2024 (aged 84)
- Party: CDU
- Occupation: Journalist

Karsten Knolle (17 January 1939 – 3 January 2024) was a German journalist and politician. A member of the Christian Democratic Union, he served in the European Parliament from 1999 to 2004.

Knolle died on 3 January 2024, at the age of 84.
