= Peadar O'Dowd =

Irish local historian

Peadar O'Dowd was a local historian from the Bóthar Mór (Bohermore) district of Galway city and a member of the Galway Archaeological and Historical Society. He was an alumnus of University College, Galway. He died on 3 January 2024.

== Select bibliography ==
- Old and new Galway, Galway, 1985.
- Vanishing Galway, Galway, 1987.
- Down by the Claddagh, Galway, 1993.
- The Great Famine and the West, Galway, 2000.
- In from the West, the McDonogh Dynasty, 2002.
- Galway in Old Photographs, Gill & Macmillan, 2003. ISBN 978-0-7171-3483-0
- A history of County Galway, Gill & Macmillan, 2004. ISBN 0-7171-3687-6
- Christmas Tales of Galway, 2006.
- Final Tales of Galway, 2009.
- Tracing your Galway Ancestors, Flyleaf Press, 2011. ISBN 978-0-9563624-2-1
