= Susie Tennant =

American music promoter

- Born: September 11, 1962; Stuttgart, Germany
- Died: January 18, 2024 (aged 61); Seattle, Washington
- Occupation: Record executive

Susie Tennant (11 September, 1962 - 18 January, 2024) was an American record executive and music promoter best known for promoting Nirvana, Sonic Youth, Weezer, and Beck.

== Early life ==
Tennant was born in Stuttgart, Germany to Charles Edward Tennant (1937 - 2023) and Mary Jo (Sigler) Tennant (born 1938). As a child of military personnel, she spent much of her childhood living in various countries and American states, including Laos, Germany, Alabama, Kentucky, California, Arizona, and Virginia. She graduated Lake Braddock Secondary School in Virginia and then moved to Seattle to attend the University of Washington.

== Career ==
Tennant began working for Sub Pop in the late 1980s where she would serve as publicist for many bands including Nirvana, Fastbacks, Sonic Youth, and Hole. During this time she became close friends with many of the band members which she worked to promote, including Dave Grohl, Krist Novoselic, and Kim Warnick, who for a time was a roommate of Tennant. In 1991 while working for Nirvana, she organized the release party for Nevermind.

Following her career at Sub Pop, she worked at DGC Records, the Experience Music Project, and Tower Records.

== Personal life and death ==
In 2011, Tennant was diagnosed with ovarian cancer. During her cancer treatment, the Seattle musical community supported her, with Krist Novoselic and other musicians and bands gathering to host benefit concerts to cover the costs of her treatment.

Following cancer treatment, she struggled with brain fog and eventually developed frontotemporal dementia. In 2021, a GoFundMe campaign was launched by a former employee of Sub Pop, with the support of Dave Grohl, Novoselic, Stone Gossard, and Jeff Ament to cover Tennant's hospital bills.

Tennant died on 18 January, 2024. Her celebration of life included performances by Christy McWilson, Chris Ballew, and the Fastbacks. She was remembered by the Seattle Times as, "a longtime member of the Seattle music community who helped break Nirvana and many other bands" and by University of Washington Magazine as, "a vibrant force with a deep passion for music."
