= Piero Errani =

Italian sports shooter (1936–2024)

Personal information
- Born: 28 December 1936 Ravenna, Italy
- Died: 25 January 2024 (aged 87)

Sport
- Sport: Sports shooting

Piero Errani (28 December 1936 – 25 January 2024) was an Italian sports shooter. He competed at the 1972 Summer Olympics and the 1976 Summer Olympics. Errani died on 25 January 2024, at the age of 87.
