= Deborah Ann Turner =

American activist and doctor

Deborah Ann Turner (October 4, 1950 – January 28, 2024) was an American physician, the 20th president of the League of Women Voters of the United States (LWVUS), and the chair of the Board of Trustees of the League of Women Voters Education Fund (LWVEF). She was elected board president at the League of Women Voters's 54th and 55th National Conventions, in June 2020 and June 2022. She died on January 28, 2024.

She worked in Omaha, Nebraska, and four other locations and specialized in General surgery, gynecologic oncology and obstetrics and gynecology. Turner was also affiliated with Mercy Medical Center & Children's Hospital Des Moines (Iowa).

== Early life and education ==
She was born in Mason City, Iowa in 1950. She graduated from Mason City High School in 1969. In 1973 she received a B.S. degree from Iowa State University where she was the first African-American woman asked to join a sorority. Turner was first interested in medicine because her older sister, Delores, was a registered nurse. She later became interested in becoming a doctor when her husband asked why she didn't become a doctor. She went on to earn her M.D. from the University of Iowa in 1978. In 1985 she became the first African-American certified by the American Board of Obstetrics and Gynecology in the specialty of gynecologic oncology.

In 2007 she received her J.D. from Drake University.

== Career ==
Turner practiced gynecologic oncology for 35 years at several universities including the University of Nebraska, the University of Iowa and the Medical College of Wisconsin. While working as a gynecological oncologist, she traveled to Tanzania multiple times to participate in medical missions and has worked with different medical centers to help the children. In July 2015 she stopped practicing medicine to work at the Iowa-based Outreach Program as vice president of International Programs. In June 2020 Turner was elected president of the League of Women Voters. She was reelected to the same position in June 2022.

== Honors and awards ==
In 1983 she was named an 'outstanding young woman of America'. Turner was inducted into the Iowa Women’s Hall of Fame in 2013 and received the Gertrude Rush Award from the National Bar Association in 2015.
