= Hamza Al-Dahdouh =

Palestinian journalist (1996-2024)

Hamza Wael Al-Dahdouh
- حمزة وائل الدحدوح
- Born: Hamza Wael Hamdan Ibrahim Al-Dahdouh; 10 July 1996; Gaza City
- Died: January 7, 2024 (aged 27); Khan Younis
- Education: University College of Applied Sciences
- Occupation: Journalist
- Employer: Al Jazeera

Hamza Wael Hamdan Ibrahim Al-Dahdouh (Arabic: حمزة وائل حمدان إبراهيم الدحدوح, romanized: Ḥamza Wāʾil Ḥamdān Ibrāhīm al-Daḥdūḥ, 10 July 1996 - 7 January 2024) was a Palestinian journalist working for Al Jazeera. He was assassinated during the Gaza war after an Israeli drone strike that targeted vehicles containing a group of journalists on their way after filming the aftermath of an Israeli strike on a home a day earlier.

== Biography ==
Born in Gaza City on 10 July 1996 to Wael Al-Dahdouh and Amina, he held a bachelor's degree in media and communication technology from the University College of Applied Science. Hamza joined Al Jazeera's Gaza bureau during the Gaza conflict, working as an assistant cameraman and a field producer, and sometimes worked as a freelancer for other media companies. Hamza married in 2022, nearly two years before his death by an Israeli drone strike.

=== Death ===
On 7 January 2024, Hamza and a freelance journalist named Mustafa Thuraya joined a group of more than 10 journalists that were filming the aftermath of an Israeli strike on the Abu al-Naja family home that happened a day earlier on 6 January in Al-Nasr, a village north of Rafah. According to Ahmed al-Bursh and Yasser Qudih, two of the more than 10 journalists filming the site on the same day, Thuraya used a low-flying commercial drone to film the effects of the strike for approximately four minutes. As the journalists left the scene after filming, a car containing al-Bursh and his colleague Abu Amr in the Palestine Today TV channel was hit by a missile projected from an Israeli drone. Seven minutes later a missile hit the car in front of the first one, this time containing Hamza, Thuraya, a third journalist named Hazem Rajab, and their driver Qusai Salem. Hamza, Thuraya, and Salem died from the strike, while Rajab got seriously injured. Hamza was transported to the Kuwaiti hospital and later buried in Rafah the same day. A day later, and again on 10 January, a representative from the IDF Spokesperson's Unit said that “An IDF aircraft identified and struck a terrorist who operated an aircraft that posed a threat to IDF troops", in reference to the event. a claim that was denied by Abu Amr, al-Bursh, Qudih, and by Al-Jazeera editor Mohamed Moawa, who stated that Thuraya used a purely commercial drone for filming when the presence of Israeli forces had disappeared and had stopped using it after they decided to leave the scene. The IDF also claimed that Thuraya was a Squad Deputy Commander in Hamas while Al Dahdouh was a member of the Palestinian Islamic Jihad militant group's electronic engineering unit and previously served as a commander in the group's Zeitun Battalion, citing a document containing the name of Hamza on a list of operatives for the group. Several experts have gone on to reject the authenticity of the document, including Erik Skare, an author of a book on the PIJ.

== Response and tributes ==
Al Jazeera Media Network strongly condemned the killing of Hamza and urged several world organizations to hold Israel accountable for its killing of journalists.

The International Federation of Journalists condemned the killings. Its affiliate, the Palestinian Journalists Syndicate condemned the killings as well, saying that Al Dahdouh's family had told the organization that the journalist had received Israeli military permission to travel out of Gaza two days before he was killed, and questioned Israeli's motive behind the killings.

United States Secretary of State Antony Blinken expressed his personal sorrow for Wael Dahdouh, saying “I am deeply, deeply sorry for the almost unimaginable loss suffered by your colleague, Wael Dahdouh. I am a parent myself, I can’t begin to imagine the horror that he has experienced, not once, but now twice.”

Tariq Ahmad, Baron Ahmad of Wimbledon expressed the importance of the tragedy of the killings, and condemned attacks on all media workers on his social platform on X (formerly known as Twitter).

On 26 January, the UN Special Rapporteur on human rights defenders released a statement raising concerns that journalists and other human rights defenders "appear to have been directly targeted," referencing the "direct missile strike" on the vehicle transporting Al Dahdouh and Thuraya. The rapporteur, whose name was not disclosed, emphasized the crucial role of local journalists due to restrictions on foreign correspondents in Gaza, stating, "the work of local journalists is vital." They further expressed concern, saying, "I fear they are being targeted as a result."

On 1 February, experts from the U.N. Human Rights Council voiced concern over “disturbing reports” of attacks on journalists visibly wearing press insignia. They stated that the pattern of attacks appears to indicate a “deliberate strategy” by Israeli forces to obstruct the media and silence critical reporting.
