= Jim McCanless =

American football player (1936–2024)

No. 60
- Position: Guard

Personal information
- Born: January 1, 1936; Buncombe County, North Carolina, U.S.
- Died: January 25, 2024 (aged 88)
- Listed height: 6 ft 2 in (1.88 m)
- Listed weight: 240 lb (109 kg)

Career information
- High school: Lee H. Edwards (Asheville, North Carolina)
- College: Clemson
- NFL draft: 1959: undrafted

Career history
- Houston Oilers (1960)

Career AFL statistics
- Games played: 1
- Stats at Pro Football Reference

James Robert McCanless (January 1, 1936 – January 25, 2024) was an American football guard who played one game in the American Football League (AFL) for the Houston Oilers. He played college football at Clemson.

== Early life and education ==
McCanless was born on January 1, 1936, in Buncombe County, North Carolina. He attended Lee H. Edwards High School, being named to the Western AAA All-Star team in 1953. Playing the guard position, McCanless was described as the team's "big man" by the Asheville Citizen-Times. After graduating, he joined Clemson University in 1954. He earned varsity letters in 1955 and 1956.

In summer 1957, McCanless suffered a broken neck in a swimming pool accident. It kept him out for the 1957 season, and McCanless was told he would never be able to play football again. Despite this, he returned to practice for his senior season in 1958 and made the final roster. His first game back came in week two against North Carolina, when he was substituted in at left tackle.

After graduating from Clemson, he spent 1959 as a coach in South Carolina.

== Professional career ==
In 1960, McCanless was signed by the Houston Oilers of the American Football League (AFL). He started in each of the five preseason games on the offensive line, and impressed enough to make the final roster. McCanless only appeared in one game with the team before being placed on waivers and released.

== Later life ==
Shortly after being released by the Oilers, McCanless accepted a position as assistant football coach and science teacher at Clyde A. Erwin High School. He later managed the Battery & Ignition Company in Asheville, North Carolina. He also served as the Buncombe County, North Carolina, Schools transportation director for over 20 years, from 1972 until at least 1992.

McCanless died on January 25, 2024.
