= Alice Mackler =

American artist (1931–2024)

Alice Mackler (1931 – January 29, 2024) was an American artist and painter.

Late in her career, her sculptures of lumpy female figures with gaping mouths gained the attention of prominent critics.

She was the subject of the 2021 monograph Alice Mackler by Matthew Higgs, Kelly Taxter, and Joanne Greenbaum.

Mackler died in a Brooklyn hospice from complications of COVID-19 at age 92.
