= Robin Herbert =

English banker (1934–2024)

Robin Arthur Eidyr Herbert (5 March 1934 – 12 January 2024) was an English banker and horticulturist who served as a president of the Royal Horticultural Society.

== Early life and education ==
Herbert was born in London to Sir John Herbert, a Conservative MP and Governor of Bengal, and Lady Mary, who had connections to the British royal family. Herbert inherited a substantial estate at a young age, which fostered his interest in gardening.

Herbert was educated at Eton College, the University of Oxford, and Harvard Business School.

In 1960, he married American Margaret Lewis and settled in Llanover, later inheriting another estate, Llanarth.

== Career ==
In 1963, Herbert began his banking career by investing in Leopold Joseph, a small London merchant bank, alongside partners such as Prince Rupert Loewenstein and Alexis de Redé. Although initially holding a peripheral position, Herbert's role within the bank grew over time, and he eventually became chairman in 1978. Under his leadership, the bank faced various challenges, including controversial clients and legal disputes, but emerged as a resilient private banking institution. Herbert's tenure concluded with the sale of the bank to the Bank of Butterfield in 2004 for £51.5 million. He also held positions at NatWest, Marks & Spencer, and the National Trust's committee for Wales.

Despite not having formal botanical training, Herbert made major contributions to horticulture through his plant-hunting expeditions and the development of extensive arboreal collections on his estates. In recognition of his dedication to the environment and horticulture, he was appointed Commander of the Order of the British Empire (CBE) in 1994.

In 2017, he was named in the Paradise Papers.

== Death ==
Herbert died on 12 January 2024, at the age of 89.
