= María Silvia Correa =

Chilean politician and diplomat (1929–2024)

María S. Correa
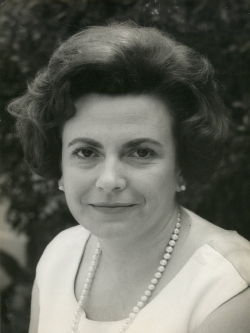
- Marín as deputy circa 1965

Ambassador of Chile in Honduras
- In office 1 January 2003 – 11 March 2006
- President: Ricardo Lagos Escobar

Governor of the Province of Maipo
- In office 11 March 1990 – 11 March 1994
- President: Patricio Aylwin Azocar
- Succeeded by: German Venegas Rodriguez

Member of the Chamber of Deputies
- In office 15 May 1965 – 15 May 1969
- Constituency: 7th Departmental Grouping, Santiago (Third District)

Personal details
- Born: 23 October 1929 San Miguel, Chile
- Died: January 2024 (aged 94)
- Party: Christian Democratic Party
- Spouse: Victor Lyon Navarrete
- Children: Silvia, Barbara and Vicente
- Parent(s): Hernán Correa Chadwick; María Luisa Marín Stuven
- Occupation: Politician

María Silvia Micaela Correa Marín (23 October 1929 – January 2024) was a Chilean Christian Democrat diplomat and politician. She was a deputy for the Seventh Departmental Group, Santiago (Third District), Metropolitan Region, between 1965 and 1969. She also served as governor of the province of Maipo, under the mandate of President Patricio Aylwin, and later Chilean ambassador to Honduras under the presidency of Ricardo Lagos.

== Life and career ==
Marín began her political career by joining the Christian Democratic Party (PDC). In 1990 she was appointed by President Patricio Aylwin as Governor of the province of Maipo. During this time, she did the corresponding paperwork to obtain an extension of land where she could make a park, a habitat that Saint Bernard. She thus obtained the land that is currently occupied by the Parque Metropolitano Sur Cerros de Chena, dependent on the Ministry of Housing and Urbanism (Minvu), and with the cooperation of the Municipality of San Bernardo. Likewise, she managed the construction of the new provincial government building.

On 1 January 2003, President Ricardo Lagos appointed her as Chilean ambassador to Honduras, a position she held for three years. In 2010, she joined the meetings of the Illustrious Municipality of San Bernardo related to the maintenance and development of the Southern Metropolitan Park Corporation, Cerros de Chena, of the Minvu. She ran the said park.

Marín died in January 2024, at the age of 94.
