= Kook Jong-nam =

South Korean businessman and politician (1937–2024)

- 국종남

Member of the National Assembly of South Korea
- In office 30 May 1992 – 29 May 1996

Personal details
- Born: 8 May 1937 Damyang County, Korea, Empire of Japan
- Died: 7 January 2024 (aged 86)
- Party: DP
- Education: Yonsei University; Kansas State University
- Occupation: Businessman

Kook Jong-nam (Korean: 국종남; 8 May 1937 – 7 January 2024) was a South Korean businessman and politician. A member of the Democratic Party, he served in the National Assembly from 1992 to 1996.

Kook died on 7 January 2024, at the age of 86.
