= Richard T. Schlosberg =

American business leader (1944–2024)

- Born: Richard T. Schlosberg III; April 6, 1944
- Died: January 10, 2024 (aged 79)

Richard T. Schlosberg III (April 6, 1944 – January 10, 2024) was an American business leader who served in executive positions at a number of newspapers and other organizations.

== Life and career ==
Schlosberg graduated from the United States Air Force Academy in 1965. As a young Air Force officer, Schlosberg served two tours of duty in Southeast Asia where he flew over 200 combat support missions as a KC-135 Stratotanker pilot.

After graduating with honors from Harvard Business School, Schlosberg began a career in publishing. He served in positions at a few newspapers, including: president of the Corpus Christi Caller-Times; publisher and CEO of the Denver Post; and president, publisher, and CEO of the Los Angeles Times from 1994 to 1997. In 1999, Schlosberg became president and CEO of the David and Lucile Packard Foundation, one of the nation's largest philanthropic foundations. He retired from this position in 2004. Schlosberg has also served on the board of directors of National Junior Achievement, the Smithsonian Institution, the National Air and Space Museum, and southern California's public television station. He served as chairman of United Way campaigns in Denver and Los Angeles.

In the eBay Inc. Annual Report regarding 2013, he was listed as Director.

Schlosberg died on January 10, 2024, at the age of 79.
