= Len Choules =

English footballer (1932–2024)

Personal information
- Date of birth: January 1932
- Place of birth: Orpington, England
- Date of death: January 2024 (aged 91)
- Position: Centre-half

Youth career
- ?–1951: Sutton United

Senior career*
Years	Team	Apps	(Gls)
1951–1962	Crystal Palace	259	(3)
1962–1963	Romford	26	(0)
- * Club domestic league appearances and goals

Len G. Choules (January 1932 – January 2024) was an English professional footballer who played as a centre-half. He made 259 appearances in the Football League for Crystal Palace and also played non-league football for Sutton United and Romford.

== Playing career ==
Choules began his career as an amateur with Sutton United and signed professional terms with Crystal Palace in May 1951. His Football League debut was not until April 1953 in a 1–1 home draw against Ipswich Town and between then and 1962, Choules made a total of 259 League appearances for Crystal Palace, scoring three times and was ever present in season 1956–57. He was also a part of the side which achieved promotion from the Fourth Division, in season 1960–61.

During his time with Crystal Palace, Choules was granted two testimonials and in 1954 was selected in an FA XI to play against Oxford University He was released by Crystal Palace on a free transfer in 1962 and moved into non-league football with Romford, but retired shortly thereafter.

== Personal life and death ==
Choules was born in Orpington, England in January 1932. He died in January 2024, just short of his 92nd birthday.
