= Cho Gyeong-sik =

South Korean politician (1936–2024)

- 조경식

Minister of Environment
- In office 3 January 1990 – 19 September 1990
- Preceded by: Lee Jae-chang (as Director of the Environmental Protection Agency)
- Succeeded by: Heo Nam-hun

Minister of Agriculture, Forestry, and Fisheries
- In office 19 September 1990 – 30 March 1992
- Preceded by: Kang Bo-seong
- Succeeded by: Kang Hyun-wook

Personal details
- Born: 2 October 1936
- Died: 29 January 2024 (aged 87)
- Education: Seoul National University; University of Manchester
- Occupation: Economist; Professor

Cho Gyeong-sik (Korean: 조경식; 2 October 1936 – 29 January 2024) was a South Korean economist, academic and politician. He served as Minister of Environment from January to September 1990 and was Minister of Agriculture, Forestry, and Fisheries from 1990 to 1992.

Cho died on 29 January 2024, at the age of 87.
