= Gu Xinyi =

Chinese engineer (1937–2024)

- 顾心怿
- Born: 23 January 1937; Jiading County, Shanghai, China
- Died: 2 January 2024 (aged 86); Jinan, Shandong, China
- Education: Central Fuel Industry Ministry Cadre School
- Scientific career
- Fields: Petroleum and mining machinery
- Workplaces: Shengli Oil Field

Chinese name
- Simplified Chinese: 顾心怿
- Traditional Chinese: 顧心懌
Transcriptions
Standard Mandarin
- Hanyu Pinyin: Gù Xīnyì

Gu Xinyi (Chinese: 顾心怿; 23 January 1937 – 2 January 2024) was a Chinese petroleum and mining machinery engineer, and an academician of the Chinese Academy of Engineering.

Gu was a member of the 9th and 10th National Committee of the Chinese People's Political Consultative Conference.

== Biography ==
Gu was born in Jiading County (now Jiading District), Shanghai, on 23 January 1937. He attended the Shanghai Jingye Middle School. After graduating from the Petroleum Machinery Vocational School Class of Shanghai Zhonghua Vocational School in August 1953, he was accepted to the Central Fuel Industry Ministry Cadre School. He joined the Chinese Communist Party in November 1955. After graduating in August 1956, he was despatched to the Expert Studio of Yumen Petroleum and Mining Bureau, where he was a translator for Soviet experts.

Starting in October 1956, he served in several posts in Shengli Oil Field, including leader of the Research and Development Team of the Oil Production Command Headquarters, mechanical technician of North China Petroleum Exploration Department, technical Leader of Dongying Trial Production Command Machine Factory, and captain of Shengli Oilfield Oil Production Research Team. In July 1982, he became a senior engineer at Shengli Oil Field, and was promoted to a professor level senior engineer at Shengli Oil Field in November 1989.

On 2 January 2024, he died in Jinan, Shandong, at the age of 86.

== Honours and awards ==
- May 1995 Member of the Chinese Academy of Engineering (CAE)
- 1999 Science and Technology Progress Award of the Ho Leung Ho Lee Foundation
