= Günter Figal =

German philosopher (1949–2024)

Günter Figal (15 July 1949 – 17 January 2024) was a German philosopher and professor of philosophy at University of Freiburg.

He was born in Langenberg. He was a specialist in the thought of Hans-Georg Gadamer and Martin Heidegger. His research focused on hermeneutics, phenomenology, German classical philosophy, and the history of metaphysics. Figal became the president of the Martin-Heidegger-Society in 2003 and resigned in 2015.

During a radio interview in 2015, Figal explicitly mentioned the Black Notebooks as a motivating factor for his resignation, specifying their antisemitic content—such as Heidegger's remark that Husserl's Jewishness limited his philosophical progression. Figal said these remarks were unworthy of a philosopher and that the content of the notebooks had come as a complete surprise to him. He drew a distinction between Heidegger's earlier work, up to and including Being and Time, and the mid-1930s writings where the antisemitic remarks appear.

Figal died in Ulm at the age of 74.

== Bibliography ==
- Aesthetics as Phenomenology: The Appearance of Things (Studies in Continental Thought), Günter Figal (Author), Translated by Jerome Veith
- The Heidegger Reader (Studies in Continental Thought), Günter Figal (Editor), Jerome Veith (Translator)
- Simplicity. On a Bowl by Young-Jae Lee, Günter Figal (Author)
- Theodor W. Adorno. Das Naturschöne als spekulative Gedankenfigur. Bouvier, Bonn 1977, ISBN 3-416-01351-4.
- Martin Heidegger. Phänomenologie der Freiheit. 3. Auflage. Beltz, Frankfurt am Main 1988, ISBN 3-895-47721-4.
  - Neuauflage: Martin Heidegger. Phänomenologie der Freiheit. Mohr Siebeck, Tübingen 2013, ISBN 3-16-152630-9.
- Martin Heidegger zur Einführung. 5. unveränderte Auflage. Junius, Hamburg 2007, ISBN 3-885-06381-6.
- Für eine Philosophie von Freiheit und Streit: Politik – Ästhetik – Metaphysik. Metzler, Stuttgart / Weimar 1994, ISBN 3-476-01204-2.
- Sokrates. 3. Auflage. Beck, München 2006, ISBN 3-406-54747-8.
- Der Sinn des Verstehens. Beiträge zur hermeneutischen Philosophie. Reclam, Stuttgart 1996, ISBN 3-150-09492-5.
- Nietzsche. Eine philosophische Einführung. Reclam, Stuttgart 1999, ISBN 3-150-09752-5.
- Lebensverstricktheit und Abstandnahme. „Verhalten zu sich“ im Anschluß an Heidegger, Kierkegaard und Hegel. Attempto, Tübingen 2001, ISBN 3-893-08311-1.
- Gegenständlichkeit. Das Hermeneutische und die Philosophie. Mohr Siebeck, Tübingen 2006, ISBN 3-161-48857-1.
- Verstehensfragen. Studien zur phänomenologisch-hermeneutischen Philosophie. Mohr Siebeck, Tübingen 2009, ISBN 3-161-49805-4.
- Erscheinungsdinge. Ästhetik als Phänomenologie. Mohr Siebeck, Tübingen 2010, ISBN 3-161-50515-8.
- Kunst. Philosophische Abhandlungen. Mohr, Tübingen 2012. ISBN 3-161-52242-7.
- Einfachheit. Über eine Schale von Young-Jae Lee. Modo, Freiburg 2014, ISBN 978-3-86833-150-9, (zweisprachig deutsch/englisch).
- Unscheinbarkeit. Der Raum der Phänomenologie. Mohr Siebeck, Tübingen 2015, unveränderte Studienausgabe 2016, ISBN 978-3-161-54346-3.
- Gibt es wirklich etwas draußen? Skizze einer realistischen Phänomenologie. In: Information Philosophie, März 2016, Heft 1, S. 8–17
