= Hava Inbar =

Holocaust survivor

Lt. Col. Hava Inbar
- חוה ענבר
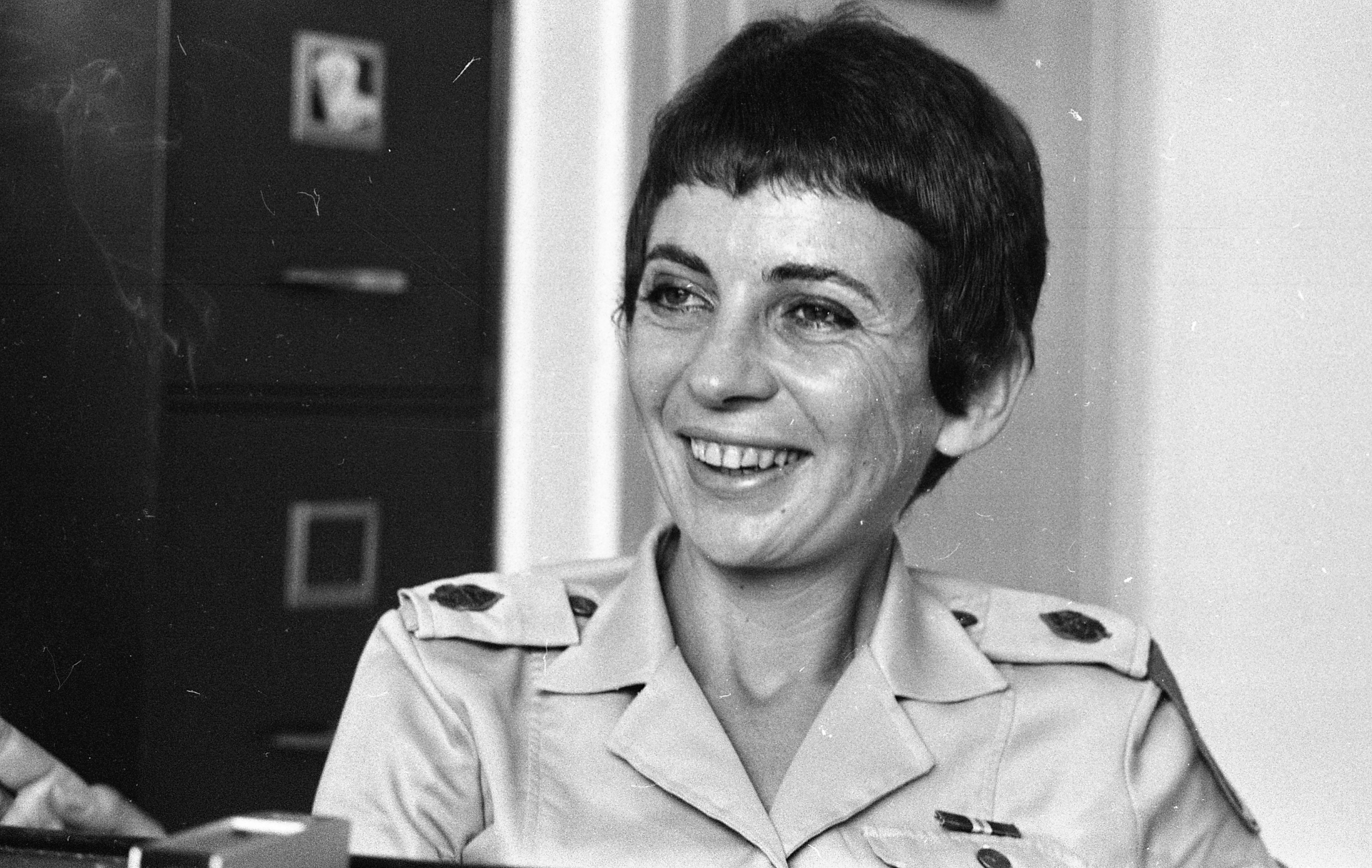
- Celebrating the first female military judge in the world from Haifa Office (ca. 1969)
- Born: Krynki, Poland
- Died: January 2024; Israel
- Education: Hebrew University of Jerusalem
- Military career
- Allegiance: Israel
- Branch: Military Advocate General
- Rank: Lieutenant colonel
- Unit: Northern Command
- Known for: World's first woman military judge

Hava Inbar (Hebrew: חוה ענבר; died January 2024) was a Holocaust survivor who went on to become a Lieutenant Colonel of the Israeli Defense Forces (IDF) and served as the first female military judge in the world.

== Biography ==
Inbar was born to Hindka Nisht in Krynki, Poland, to the Nisht (Niv) family. During the Holocaust she was incarcerated in Auschwitz concentration camp. At age 16 she was interested in a career with the diplomatic corps but decided to instead pursue a career in law. She eventually immigrated to Israel where she studied law at Hebrew University of Jerusalem before going on to serve as a defense lawyer for Northern Command of the Israeli Defense Forces (IDF) for ten years across numerous cases.

Inbar became the world's first female military judge when she was given a judgeship in the Haifa Military Court in September 1969, while still a master sergeant. She was quickly met with praise for her sense of humor, outspoken advocacy on behalf of the IDF, and ability to get religious soldiers and Druze to appear in court despite feared cultural reservations about her appointment. During her time as a judge, Inbar ultimately attained the rank of lieutenant colonel.

She was living in Ramat Hasharon, where she died in January 2024.
