= Per Sønstabø =

Norwegian footballer (1941–2024)

Personal information
- Date of birth: 2 May 1941
- Place of birth: Haugesund, German-occupied Norway
- Date of death: 22 January 2024 (aged 82)
- Place of death: Haugesund, Norway
- Position: Defender

Senior career*
Years	Team	Apps	(Gls)
1958–1977	Vard		

International career
1965	Norway	1	(0)
- * Club domestic league appearances and goals

Per Sønstabø (2 May 1941 – 22 January 2024) was a Norwegian footballer. A defender, he spent his entire career with his hometown club Vard, where he reached the Norwegian Cup Final on two occasions: in 1962 and 1975. He also played one match for the Norway national team in 1965. Sønstabø died in Haugesund on 22 January 2024, at the age of 82.
