= Grace Boadu =

Ghanaian herbal medicine practitioner (died 2024)

- Born: Ejisu Abankro, Ghana
- Died: 29 January 2024; Tantra Hills
- Education: Kwame Nkrumah University of Science and Technology
- Occupation: Herbalist
- Medical career
- Field: Herbal medicine
- Institutions: Grace Gift Herbal Hospital and Laboratory Services

Grace Boadu Kumanin (died 29 January 2024) was a Ghanaian herbal medicine practitioner, the founder and CEO of Grace Gift Herbal Hospital and Laboratory Services. She was a member of the World Diplomatic Federation and also the Herbal Health Evangelion Ambassador.

== Early life and education ==
Boadu hailed from Ejisu Abankro in the Ashanti Region of Ghana. She attended Kwame Nkrumah University of Science and Technology where she studied nursing. She also attended St. Gilbert Nursing College in Kumasi in the Ashanti Region of Ghana. In 2019, she received a doctorate award from City University in Cambodia.

== Career ==
Boadu began her career as a nurse before she became a herbal medicine practitioner. She worked at the County Hospital in Kumasi. Mary Lucy Hospital in Accra; Kropo Charity Hospital, and Ebenezer Maternity Home in Kumasi.

== Philanthropy ==
In November 2023, she donated GHC10,000 towards the renovation of the Komfo Anokye Teaching Hospital.

== Personal life ==
Boadu had an uncle called Akwasi Addae. She was not married and had no children. She also had a brother called Emmanuel Boadu.

=== Death and burial ===
Boadu died on 29 January 2024 after it was alleged she slipped in her bathroom and hit her head on the ground. She died at her residence at Tantra Hills in Accra. She was buried on 9 March 2024 at Ejisu Abankro in the Ashanti Region of Ghana.

== Awards and honours ==
In March 2023, her clinic was honoured with the ‘Best Outstanding Herbal Centre of the Year’ during the 6th West African Traditional and Alternative Medical Awards which were held in Accra.

In December 2023, Keche honoured Boadu after a member of the musical group had medical treatment from her facility.
