= Amanda Hanson =

American journalist and television presenter

- Born: June 10, 1985; USA
- Died: January 25, 2024 (aged 38); Memphis, Tennessee, United States
- Education: University of Memphis
- Occupation: Journalist

Amanda Hanson (June 10, 1985 – January 25, 2024) was an American journalist and television presenter.

== Biography ==
Hanson's career in journalism started at the KAIT television station in Jonesboro, Arkansas, where she worked from 2010 to 2015 and again from 2018 to 2021.

She studied communications at the University of Memphis and earned a master's degree in strategic communications in 2020. She worked for the Arkansas channel K8 News, Memphis' Action News 5 and state newscast TN In Ten. She was the leader of digital innovation for the NBC affiliate WMC. She and her husband Darren had one daughter.

She died on January 25, 2024, at the age of 38 in Memphis, Tennessee. Her death was a result from complications after having an undisclosed medical emergency.
