= Leonard Glick =

American anthropologist, historian and author

- Born: December 31, 1929
- Died: January 9, 2024 (aged 94)
- Years active: 1972–2014
- Notable work: Abraham's Heirs; Marked in Your Flesh
- Title: Anthropologist and historian of ideas
- Website: http://asteria.fivecolleges.edu/findaids//mah018.html

Leonard Glick (December 31, 1929 ~ January 9, 2024) was an American anthropologist, historian of ideas, and author. He served as professor of anthropology at Hampshire College from 1972 to 2002. His scholarly work predominantly focused on the history of Judaism.

== Notable work ==
=== Abraham's Heirs: Jews and Christians in Medieval Europe ===
Glick published Abraham's Heirs: Jews And Christians In Medieval Europe in 1999, focusing on the interaction between Jews and Christians during the 5th to 15th century.

The book argues that the Jewish experience was profoundly shaped by the overwhelmingly medieval Christian majority.

=== Marked in Your Flesh: Circumcision From Ancient Judea To Modern America ===
Glick published Marked In Your Flesh: Circumcision From Ancient Judea To Modern America in 2005. It deals with the history of brit milah.

He theorizes that milah originated during the Babylonian exile among the Judean priests who are believed to have composed the P source of the Torah. And that the main justification among Jewish philosophers and religious leaders lies in beliefs surrounding the control of male sexuality, as a visual marker of the Abrahamic covenant, beliefs surrounding fertility, and a sign of the father submitting to the political social order.

== Personal life ==
Glick was a Reform Jew. He had three sons. He died aged 94 on January 9, 2024.

== Works ==
- (1973). Beyond The Classics: Essays In The Scientific Study Of Religion
- (1974). Jewish Life And Culture In Eastern Europe
- (1980). An Automotive Camshaft Degreeing Fixture
- (1999). Abraham's Heirs: Jews and Christians In Medieval Europe
- (2005). Marked in Your Flesh: Circumcision From Ancient Judea To Modern America
