= Aris Bouloukos =

Greek military officer and politician (1932–2024)

- Αρισ Μπουλούκος

Member of the Hellenic Parliament
- In office 1985–1989
- Constituency: Athens B
- In office 1977–1981
- Constituency: Messenia

Personal details
- Born: Aristodimos Bouloukis; 29 September 1932 Kalamata, Greece
- Died: 17 January 2024 (aged 91) Kalamata, Greece
- Party: Pasok (until 1989); ND (since 1989)
- Education: Hellenic Military Academy
- Occupation: Military officer

Aristodimos Bouloukos (Greek: Αριστόδημος Μπουλούκος; 29 September 1932 – 17 January 2024) was a Greek military officer and politician. A member of Pasok and later New Democracy, he served in the Hellenic Parliament from 1977 to 1981 and again from 1985 to 1990.

Bouloukos died in Kalamata on 17 January 2024, at the age of 91.
