= H. T. Dickinson =

English historian (1939–2024)

H. T. Dickinson FRSE
- Born: Harry Thomas Dickinson; 9 March 1939; Gateshead, England
- Died: January 24, 2024 (aged 84)
- Occupations: Writer, author, historian
- Writing career
- Language: English
- Genre: History

Harry Thomas Dickinson FRSE (9 March 1939 – 24 January 2024) was an English historian specialising in British eighteenth century politics. He obtained his BA and MA from the University of Durham and his PhD from the University of Newcastle upon Tyne. He was Reader in History and later Richard Lodge Professor of British History at the University of Edinburgh. He was editor of the journal History from 1993 to 2000. Isaac Kramnick wrote that of the biographies of Lord Bolingbroke, Dickinson's was the "most reliable". In the opinion of David Armitage, Dickinson's life of Lord Bolingbroke "replaced all earlier accounts".

Dickinson died on 24 January 2024, at the age of 84.

== Works ==
- (editor), The Correspondence of Sir James Clavering (1967).
- Bolingbroke: "The Idea of a Patriot King", History Today 20, I (January 1970), pp. 13–19.
- Bolingbroke (1970).
- Walpole and the Whig Supremacy (1973).
- (editor), Politics and Literature in Eighteenth-Century Britain (1974).
- Liberty and Property: Political Ideology in Eighteenth-Century Britain (1977 and 1979).
- 'Whiggism in the eighteenth century', in John Cannon (ed.), The Whig Ascendancy. Colloquies on Hanoverian Britain (1981), pp. 28–44.
- (editor), The Political Works of Thomas Spence (1982).
- British Radicalism and the French Revolution, 1789-1815 (1985).
- Caricatures and the Constitution, 1760-1832 (1986).
- (editor), Britain and the French Revolution, 1789-1815 (1989).
- The Politics of the People in Eighteenth-Century Britain (1994 and 1995).
- (editor), Britain and the American Revolution (1998).
- (editor, with Michael Lynch), The Challenge to Westminster (2000).
- '"The Friends of America": British sympathy with the American Revolution', in Michael T. Davis (ed.), Radicalism and Revolution in Britain, 1775-1848 (2000).
- (editor), A Companion to Eighteenth-Century Britain (2002).
- 'Richard Price on reason and revolution', in William Gibson and Robert G. Ingram (eds.), Religion, Politics and Identity, 1660-1832 (2005).
- (editor), Constitutional Documents of the United Kingdom, 1782-1835 (2005).
- 25 entries in Gregory Fremont-Barnes (ed.), Encyclopedia of the Age of Political Revolutions and New Ideologies, 1760-1815 (2007).
- 'The Representation of the People in Eighteenth-Century Britain', in Maia Jansson (ed.), Realities and Representation (2007), pp. 19–44.
- (editor), British Pamphlets on the American Revolution, 1763 - 1785. 8 vols. (2007-8).
- (co-editor), Reactions to Revolutions (2007).
