= Mario Kontny =

German footballer (1953–2024)

Personal information
- Date of birth: 7 April 1953
- Place of birth: Germany
- Date of death: 17 January 2024 (aged 70)
- Position: Defender

Senior career*
Years	Team	Apps	(Gls)
1972–1977	Werder Bremen	76	(3)
- * Club domestic league appearances and goals

Mario Kontny (7 April 1953 – 17 January 2024) was a German professional footballer who played as a defender for Werder Bremen.
