= Han Song (politician) =

Chinese politician

- 韩松

Chairperson of Xi'an Municipal People's Congress
- In office March 2022 – July 2025
- Preceded by: Hu Runze
- Succeeded by: Zhao Jing

Personal details
- Born: June 1965 (age 61) Linyi Special Zone, Shandong, China
- Party: Chinese Communist Party (expelled)

Chinese name
- Simplified Chinese: 韩松
- Traditional Chinese: 韓松
Transcriptions
Standard Mandarin
- Hanyu Pinyin: Hán Sōng

Han Song (Chinese: 韩松; born June 1965) is a former Chinese politician who spent most of his career in northwest China's Shaanxi province. He was investigated by China's top anti-graft agency in July 2025. Previously he served as chairperson of Xi'an Municipal People's Congress.

== Early life and education ==
Han was born in Linyi Special Zone (now Linyi), Shandong, in June 1965.

== Career ==
Han joined the Chinese Communist Party (CCP) in January 1986, and entered the workforce in August 1989.

Han successively served in the Ministry of Foreign Trade, State Council, and State Administration for Industry and Commerce.

In March 2006， Han was transferred to northwest China's Shaanxi province and appointed vice mayor of Xi'an, in addition to serving as director of Xi'an International Port Area Management Committee and chairman of Xi'an International Land Port Investment and Development Co., Ltd.. In January 2015, he was admitted to standing committee member of the CCP Xi'an Municipal Committee, the city's top authority. He was made deputy party secretary in January 2017, concurrently serving as president of the Party School and secretary of the Political and Legal Affairs Commission. In March 2022, he took office as chairperson of Xi'an Municipal People's Congress, the city's top legislative body.

== Downfall ==
On 14 July 2025, Han was put under investigation for alleged "serious violations of discipline and laws" by the Central Commission for Discipline Inspection (CCDI), the party's internal disciplinary body, and the National Supervisory Commission, the highest anti-corruption agency of China. Han was expelled from the party and dismissed from the public office on 6 February 2026.

Assembly seats
Preceded by Hu Runze (胡润泽)	Chairperson of Xi'an Municipal People's Congress; 2022–2025	Succeeded by Zhao Jing
