= Dorvan Solberg =

American politician (1934–2024)

Member of the North Dakota House of Representatives from the 2nd district
- In office 1999–2008

Personal details
- Born: May 20, 1934 Williston, North Dakota
- Died: January 21, 2024 (aged 89)
- Party: North Dakota Democratic-NPL Party
- Spouse: Eileen
- Education: Jamestown College, Hamline University
- Occupation: Rancher

Dorvan I. Solberg (May 20, 1934 – January 21, 2024) was a North Dakota Democratic-NPL Party member of the North Dakota House of Representatives, representing the 2nd district from 1999 to 2008. He was a candidate for district 2 Senate.
