= Keith Davies (footballer) =

English footballer (1934–2024)

Personal information
- Full name: Edward Keith Davies
- Date of birth: 19 February 1934
- Place of birth: Birkenhead, England
- Date of death: 13 January 2024
- Place of death: Fort Saskatchewan, Canada.
- Position: Inside forward

Senior career*
Years	Team	Apps	(Gls)
1953–1954	Tranmere Rovers	1	(0)
- * Club domestic league appearances and goals

Edward Keith Davies (19 February 1934 – 13 January 2024) was an English footballer, who played as an inside forward in the Football League for Tranmere Rovers. He died in 2024, having moved to Canada in the 1960s.
