= Bernd Wegner (mathematician) =

German mathematician, editor of ZbMath (1942 – 2024)

Bernd Wegner (11 February 1942 – 18 January 2024) was a German mathematician. He was the editor-in-chief of Zentralblatt für Mathematik from 1974 until 2011.

== Education and career ==
Wegner was born on 11 February 1942, in Berlin. He attended high school at the Humboldt Gymnasium in Berlin. He then attended the Technische Universität Berlin, receiving his diploma in 1966. He stayed at Technische Universität Berlin for his PhD, which he completed in 1970 under the direction of Kurt Leichtweiß, with a dissertation titled Beiträge zur Differentialgeometrie transnormaler Mannigfaltigeiten. He spent the remainder of his career at Technische Universität Berlin, retiring in 2007.

Wegner became editor-in-chief of Zentralblatt für Mathematik (later zbMATH Open) in 1974, taking over from Ulrich Güntzer. His tenure as editor encompassed the separation of East Germany from zbMath, the reunification of East and West Germany, and the transition of zbMath from a paper resource to a digital resource. While editor-in-chief, Wegner also helped to set up procedures for maintenance of the Mathematics Subject Classification. He stepped down in 2011, and was succeeded by Gert-Martin Greuel.

== Personal life ==
Wegner died on 18 January 2024, following a fall.
