= Ahmad Mahfuz Umar =

Yemeni writer (1936–2024)

Ahmad Mahfuz Umar (Arabic: أحمد محفوظ عمر, romanized: Aḥmad Maḥfūẓ ʻUmar; 1936 – 27 January 2024) was a Yemeni writer. Born in Aden, he was considered to be one of the pioneering figures of modern Yemeni literature and was a co-founder of the Yemeni Writers' Union. At an early age, he won a short story competition organised by the journal Al-Nahdah with his story Murdi'at al-atfal (1956). His stories often deal with life in the big city and similar gritty themes. He published several collections of short fiction, including Al-indhar al-mumazzaq (1960), Al-agras al-samita (1974), Ya ahl hadha al-jabal (1978) and Al-nab al-azraq (1980).

Umar's work has been translated into Italian and was included in a 2009 anthology of Yemeni literature called Perle dello Yemen.
