= Ignacio Estrada =

American ventriloquist (1946–2024)

- Born: July 27, 1946; Edinburg, Texas
- Died: January 28, 2024 (aged 77); San Antonio, Texas
- Other names: Nacho
- Occupation: Ventriloquist

Ignacio Estrada (July 27, 1946 – January 28, 2024) was an American ventriloquist based in South Texas. Estrada performed in public schools in Texas for over forty years where he worked as an entertainer and taught morals. Estrada, who also performed under the name "Nacho", was known for his two puppets, Maclovio and Tortiya Monster.

== Early life ==
Ignacio “Nacho” Estrada was born in Edinburg, to María (Nieves) Estrada and Salvador Estrada; his father worked as a farmer. The 1950 census listed him as having five other siblings and living in Cameron County. He worked in a grocery store and dressed as Ronald McDonald for a local McDonald's, claiming to be the first latino to portray the mascot.

== Career ==
His interest in ventriloquism came when he was in high school working in a local grocery shop where he encountered a man who could "throw his voice"; this moment inspired Ignacio and he started practicing ventriloquism daily and played pranks on his coworkers and family. One of his first times using ventriloquism was pranking his coworker Mr. Morgan by making it sound like a person from afar was calling his name.

While working in special education in the 1970s he used his ventriloquism skills to humor the students. In the 1980s he created his two best known puppet characters, Maclovio and Tortiya Monster. Estrada started going to most elementary and middle schools around South Texas entertaining the students; he would also travel to Mexico.

Estrada used his puppets to also teach morals including drug awareness and anti-bullying messages.

== Personal life ==
Estrada married his wife, Sallie Kay Bell, on November 4, 1967 in Burlington, Texas. They had two children. In the 1970s the family moved to Eagle Pass where Ignacio originally worked as a bus driver and then as a teachers aide in special education. He lived in Uvalde for a while and eventually settled down in San Antonio to raise his family. He was a Jehovah's Witness.

Ignacio Estrada died on January 28, 2024, at age 77, at his home in San Antonio after a lengthy illness. He was survived by his wife, two children and two grandchildren. A memorial service took place on April 6.
