= Edward E. Crutchfield =

American banker (1941/1942–2024)

Edward E. Crutchfield (1941/1942 – January 2, 2024) was an American banker. As president of First Union, he led the bank into becoming one of the largest in the United States.

Crutchfield was inducted into the North Carolina Business Hall of Fame in 2001.

Crutchfield died on January 2, 2024, at the age of 82.
