= Sheng Zhiyong =

Chinese burn surgeon (1920–2024)

- 盛志勇
- Born: 1 July 1920; Shanghai, China
- Died: 27 January 2024 (aged 103); Beijing, China
- Education: Shanghai Medical University
- Scientific career
- Fields: Burn surgery
- Workplaces: The 4th Medical Center of the PLA General Hospital

Sheng Zhiyong (Chinese: 盛志勇; pinyin: Shèng Zhìyǒng; 1 July 1920 – 27 January 2024) was a Chinese burn surgeon who was vice president of the 304 Hospital of the People's Liberation Army, and an academician of the Chinese Academy of Engineering.

== Biography ==
Sheng was born into a family of doctors in Yangshupu, Shanghai, on 1 July 1920, while his ancestral home in Deqing County, Zhejiang. After graduating from Shanghai Medical University in 1942, he worked at the 1st Hospital of Shanghai Red Cross. In 1947, he went to the School of Medicine, Texas State University as a visiting scholar for further studies, and returned to China on 31 December 1948.

In January 1949, he worked at Shanghai Hudong Hospital and subsequently Shanghai Zhongshan Hospital in January 1950. In the same year, he joined the medical team of the People's Volunteer Army. On 25 January 1951, he became a member of the First Batch of Volunteer Medical and Surgical Teams of the People's Volunteer Army. He worked at the 2nd Army Hospital in Qiqihar, mainly responsible for treating wounded volunteers.

In 1952, he was transferred to the Military Medical Sciences Academy as deputy director of the Department of Experimental Surgery, responsible for the business of experimental surgery and establishing an animal laboratory to expand the area of the surgical laboratory. In January 1961, he became director of Trauma Surgery at the PLA 301 Hospital. In 1962, he went to the General Hospital of the Tibet Military District to treat the wounded sent from the front in the Sino-Indian War. In 1979, after the outbroke of the Sino-Vietnamese War, he went to Guangxi to inspect the treatment of war injuries in military hospitals.

In January 1981, he was vice president of the 4th Medical Center of the PLA General Hospital and director of the Trauma Surgery Center of the Military Medical Training College. During his tenure at the PLA 304 Hospital, he established the Trauma Surgery Center.

On 27 January 2024, he died in Beijing, at the age of 103.

== Honours and awards ==
- 1996 Member of the Chinese Academy of Engineering (CAE)
- 1999 Science and Technology Progress Award of the Ho Leung Ho Lee Foundation
- 2013 Wu Jieping Medical Prize
