= Keith Fraser (Bay Area sportsman) =

American sportsman and author (1937–2024)

- At his shop
- Born: March 6, 1937; San Anselmo, California, U.S.
- Died: January 22, 2024 (aged 86); Tiburon, California, U.S.

Donald Keith Fraser (March 6, 1937 – January 23, 2024) was an American sportsman and author of Keith Fraser's Guide to Sturgeon Fishing, currently in its 4th printing.

Fraser, known locally as "Lord of the Sea", The Sturgeon General of the Bay Area, or simply "The Baitman". He was co-owner and operator of Loch Lomond Live Bait in San Rafael, California for over 50 years. He was an area fishing celebrity for being the featured speaker at the annual seminar, Sturgeon Fishing in Bay Area Waters, for over 40 years.

Fraser was featured in a short documentary, Christmas at the Bait Shop by award-winning filmmaker Judy Irving, about almost-tame sea birds that frequent the bait shop. Keith Fraser and his bird friends have appeared on Bay Area Back Roads, Evening Magazine, Tom Stienstra's Great Outdoors, and Judy Irving's short film, "Salt Pond Habitat Restoration".

Fraser was the founding president of United Anglers of California, inspired the first hatchery plants of striped bass and sturgeon in San Francisco Bay in California history, the crackdown on sturgeon snaggers, and by example, had inspired thousands to release sturgeon so they may grow to old age and giant sizes.

Fraser died in Tiburon, California on January 22, 2024, at the age of 86.

== Awards ==
Inducted into Marin Athletic Hall of Fame (2000)

Inducted into California Outdoor Hall of Fame (2003)

Nominees must have (1) inspired thousands of Californians to take part in the great outdoors and/or conservation, and (2) have taken part in a paramount scope of adventures.

Inductees are selected from nominations from the California Department of Tourism, California Department of Fish and Game, media members and Hall of Fame members. The award is sponsored by the International Sportsmen's Exposition.

Runner-up for "Californian of the Year" award (2006)

== Books ==
Author of Keith Fraser's Guide to Sturgeon Fishing, currently in its 4th printing.
