= Park Jong-geun =

South Korean economist and politician (1937–2024)

- 박종근

Member of the National Assembly of South Korea
- In office 30 May 1996 – 29 May 2012
- Preceded by: Kim Han-gyu
- Succeeded by: Hong Ji-man
- Constituency: Daegu Dalseo-gu A

Personal details
- Born: 5 February 1937; Sangju, Korea, Empire of Japan
- Died: 25 January 2024 (aged 86); Suncheon, South Korea
- Political party: ULD; Saenuri Party; Future Hope Alliance
- Education: Seoul National University; Washington State University
- Occupation: Economist

Park Jong-geun (Korean: 박종근; 5 February 1937 – 25 January 2024) was a South Korean politician. A member of the United Liberal Democrats, the Saenuri Party, and later the Future Hope Alliance, he served in the National Assembly from 1996 to 2012.

Park died on 25 January 2024, at the age of 86.
