= Samiro Yunoki =

Japanese artist (1922–2024)

- 柚木沙弥郎
- Born: October 17, 1922; Tabata, Tokyo, Japan
- Died: January 31, 2024 (aged 101); Shibuya, Tokyo, Japan
- Education: University of Tokyo
- Occupations: katazome artist, mingei folk crafts artist, educator
- Known for: Katazome
- Movement: Mingei

Samiro Yunoki (Yunoki Samirō (柚木沙弥郎)); October 17, 1922 – January 31, 2024) was a Japanese artist and professor of the Joshibi University of Art and Design, best known for his work in katazome stencil dyeing.

Influenced by Soetsu Yanagi, founder of the mingei (folk crafts) movement, he studied the katazome stencil dyeing technique with craftsman Keisuke Serizawa. His art includes traditional katazome stencil-dyed works such as kimono or noren, but also prints, picture books, cutouts and three-dimensional sculptures. He was heavily involved in the Mingei folk crafts movement. He was a professor at the Joshibi University of Art and Design from 1950 to 1991, where was nominated as the 7th President of the university in 1987.
