= Gyula Tóth (politician) =

Hungarian politician (1948–2024)

Member of the National Assembly of Hungary
- In office 15 May 2002 – 13 May 2010
- Constituency: Individual Constituency Tolna County No. 4

Personal details
- Born: 29 July 1948 Dombóvár, Hungary
- Died: 24 January 2024 (aged 75)
- Party: MSZP
- Education: Ferenc Kölcsey Teacher Training College of the Reformed Church; MSZMP Political College
- Occupation: Schoolteacher

Gyula Tóth (29 July 1948 – 24 January 2024) was a Hungarian schoolteacher and politician. A member of the Hungarian Socialist Party, he served in the National Assembly from 2002 to 2010.

Tóth died on 24 January 2024, at the age of 75.
