= Glenn Black =

Lauchlann Glenn Black (died 12 January 2024) was a literature scholar. He was the first fellow and tutor in English Literatureat Oriel College, Oxford. He taught the main period papers (1500-1832). Black held a master's degree, (M.A.) and a doctorate (D.Phil.), taking his Bachelor's (B.A.) in Cape Town. He was Junior Proctor 1985–1986, Chairman of the General Board 1996–1999, Pro-Vice-Chancellor (Academic) 2000-2002 and a former Rhodes Scholar at Oxford University. After retiring in 2010, Black continued serving as Senior Tutor at Oriel College until 2012. His research interests lay in Renaissance poetry and rhetoric and manuscript circulation.
