= Elizabeth Cosnett =

British hymnodist (1936–2024)

- Born: Elizabeth Joan Cosnett; 17 May 1936; Liverpool, England
- Died: 22 January 2024 (aged 87)
- Occupation: Hymnodist

Elizabeth Joan Cosnett (17 May 1936 – 22 January 2024) was a British hymnodist.

== Biography ==
Elizabeth Joan Cosnett was born on 17 May 1936 in Liverpool, England. She was educated at St Hugh's College, Oxford and went on to become an English lecturer at the Liverpool Institute of Higher Education, retiring in 1996. Her hymns came to attention between the age of 49 and 52, rather later than the average hymnodist, when her collaborations with Ian Sharp won the 1985 and 1988 Songs of Praise competitions organised by the BBC. From 1999 until her retirement in 2002, she was the Executive President of the Hymn Society of Great Britain and Ireland. Cosnett died on 22 January 2024, at the age of 87.

== Output ==
Hymns written by Elizabeth Cosnett include:

- Can we by searching find out God
- Shaping spirit, move among us
- We bring our children, Lord, today
- What have we to show our Saviour
- When candles are lighted on Candlemas Day
