= Bud Fendler =

American politician

Missouri House of Representatives

Personal details
- Born: 1935 Lemay, Missouri
- Died: 2024 (aged 88–89)
- Resting place: Park Lawn Cemetery in Lemay, Missouri
- Party: Democratic
- Spouse(s): Carol Ann Klose; Barbara S. Green Goins
- Children: 5 (4 sons, 1 daughter), 3 stepchildren
- Occupation: salesman

Ernst "Bud" Fendler Jr. (September 29, 1935 - January 29, 2024) was a Democratic politician who served in the Missouri House of Representatives in the 1970s. He was born in Lemay, Missouri in the St. Louis area. Fendler was educated at St. Andrew's Elementary School in Lemay and at Christian Brothers College and served six years in the U.S. Air Force Reserve. On March 29, 1958, he married Carol Ann Klose in the St. Louis area. He was later married Barbara Green Goins for 29 years and became a stepfather to her three children.
