= Han Song (academic) =

South Korean academic (1947–2024)

- Hangul: 한송
- Hanja: 韓松
- RR: Han Song
- MR: Han Song

Han Song (19 August 1947 – 22 January 2024) was a South Korean academic who was professor of Gangneung-Wonju National University in the department of dentistry. He also served as the university's president from 2003 to July 2011. Han died on 22 January 2024, at the age of 76.
