= Battle of Hamburg =

Battle of Hamburg may refer to:

- Battle of Hamburg (air) (24 July – 30 July 1943), an Allied strategic bombing campaign (codenamed "Operation Gomorrah") in which over 40,000 German civilians were killed
- Capture of Hamburg (18 April – 3 May 1945), one of the last European battles of the Second World War. Fought between the British VIII Corps and the German 1st Parachute Army.
- The Battle of Hamburg (book), a book by Martin Middlebrook about the air battle
- The Battle of Hamburg, a football match at UEFA Euro 2024 between Czechia and Türkiye
