= The Bomber Command War Diaries =

- First edition
- Author: Martin Middlebrook and Chris Everitt
- Subject: World War II
- Genre: History
- Publisher: Viking
- Publication date: 1985
- Pages: 804 pages
- ISBN: 0-670-80137-2

The Bomber Command War Diaries (subtitled: An Operational Reference Book, 1939 -1945) is a book by the British military historian Martin Middlebrook and the researcher Chris Everitt that documents every operation by RAF Bomber Command in Europe in World War II. The book also details the operational performances of each squadron and group and it remains in print today.

Everitt who had served in the RAF throughout the war as ground staff was the recently retired Chief Administrative Officer of Slough College and his research for the book involved over 300 visits to the Public Record Office.

- The Bomber Command War Diaries – R.A.F. An Operational Reference Book 1939–1945 by Martin Middlebrook and Chris Everitt – Viking – 1985 – ISBN 0-670-80137-2
- Reprint edition Ian Allan Publishing Publishing – 2011 – ISBN 978-1857803358
