= The Berlin Raids =

Book by Martin Middlebrook

- First edition
- Author: Martin Middlebrook
- Subject: World War II
- Genre: History
- Publisher: Viking, Cassell
- Publication date: 1988, 2000
- Pages: 407 pages
- ISBN: 0304353477
- OCLC: 45438698
- LC Class: D757.9 .B4 M53 2000

The Berlin Raids (subtitled: R.A.F. Bomber Command Winter 1943–44) is a book by the British military historian Martin Middlebrook describing the RAF Bomber Command attacks on the German city of Berlin in the Winter of 1943–1944.

These series of raids have become known as The Battle of Berlin.

The book attempts to give a non-partisan account and goes into great detail about the raids, including interviews with participants from both sides.
