= Martin Middlebrook =

English military historian and author (1932–2024)

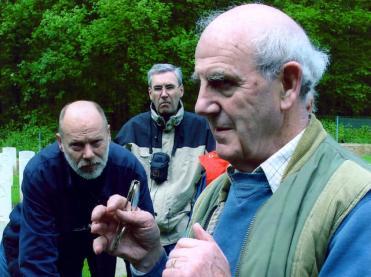
- Middlebrook speaking in 2014
- Born: 24 January 1932; Boston, Lincolnshire, England
- Died: 19 January 2024 (aged 91); Cheltenham, England
- Occupation: author
- Spouse: Mary Middlebrook
- Writing career
- Genre: military history
- Subjects: World War I, World War II, Falklands War
- Notable works: The First Day on the Somme, The Nuremberg Raid, The Berlin Raids

Martin Middlebrook FRHistS (24 January 1932 – 19 January 2024) was an English military historian and author.

== Education and military service ==
Middlebrook was educated at various schools, including Ratcliffe College, Leicester. He entered National Service in 1950, was commissioned in the Royal Army Service Corps (RASC), and served as a Motor Transport Officer in the Suez Canal Zone and Aqaba, Jordan. Middlebrook subsequently spent three years in Territorial Army service.

== Career ==
Middlebrook wrote his first book The First Day on the Somme (1971) following a visit to the First World War battlefields of France and Belgium in 1967. The book is a detailed study of the single worst day for the British Army. Middlebrook gave the same single-day treatment to 21 March 1918, the opening of the German spring offensive, in The Kaiser's Battle. Middlebrook's Second World War books concentrate on the air war. A number of them again deal with a single day of action (The Nuremberg Raid, The Schweinfurt–Regensburg Mission and The Peenemünde Raid) while others cover longer air battles (The Battle of Hamburg and The Berlin Raids). Middlebrook also wrote two books on the Falklands War, one from the British and Falkland Islanders' perspective and one from the Argentinian perspective.

== Death ==
Middlebrook died in Cheltenham on 19 January 2024, at the age of 91.

== Honours ==
Middlebrook was a Fellow of the Royal Historical Society (FRHistS). He was appointed Knight of the Order of the Belgian Crown in 2004.

== Books ==
- The First Day on the Somme with much co-operation from John Howlett. (1971) OCLC 462049234
- The Nuremberg Raid (1973) OCLC 463009305
- Convoy SC.122 & HX.229 (1976) ISBN 9781848844780
- Battleship: the loss of the Prince of Wales and the Repulse (with Patrick Mahoney) (1977) ISBN 0713910429
- The Kaiser's Battle with much co-operation from Neville Mackinder. (1978) ISBN 071391081X
- The Battle of Hamburg (1980)
- The Peenemünde Raid (1982)
- The Schweinfurt-Regensburg Mission (1983)
- The Bomber Command War Diaries (1985) (with the late Chris Everitt) ISBN 0670801372
- The Falklands War, 1982 (1985) first published as Operation Corporate
- The Berlin Raids (1988)
- The Somme Battlefields: a Comprehensive Guide from Crʹecy to the Two World Wars (with his wife Mary Middlebrook) (1991) ISBN 0670830836
- Arnhem 1944 (1994) ISBN 081332498X
- Your Country Needs You: from Six to Sixty-five Divisions (2000) ISBN 0850527112
- The Argentine fight for the Falklands. Pen & Sword Military. 2003. ISBN 9781783032020.
- Captain Staniland's Journey: The North Midlands Territorials Go To War (2003) ISBN 9780850529968
