= The First Day on the Somme =

1971 book by Martin Middlebrook

- Author: Martin Middlebrook
- Language: English
- Genre: Non-fiction
- Publisher: Allen Lane
- Publication date: 1971
- ISBN: 0-14-139071-9

The First Day on the Somme (ISBN 0-14-139071-9) is a First World War military history book by Martin Middlebrook, first published in 1971 and still in print, which is regarded as a seminal work in the field of World War I scholarship reflecting the United Kingdom's perspective in the conflict. Its text covers in detail the events leading up to and during 1 July 1916, the first day of the Battle of the Somme, concentrating almost exclusively on the British Army's experiences and focussing only in relief on French Army's contribution, especially south of the Somme River.

Early chapters deal with the formation of Kitchener's Army (New Army), which comprised a substantial part of the British Army's order of battle for the day, and the origins and planning of the Somme offensive. The coverage of the fighting is divided by time of day, starting with the hours leading up to "zero", followed by "zero hour", the morning, afternoon and night, with review chapters between each to sum up the fighting. The book concludes with the aftermath of the first day and a calculation of the cost of the fighting. The British casualty figures compiled by Middlebrook are often quoted as the definitive tally for 1 July.

Throughout the book Middlebrook uses quotations from soldiers involved in the fighting on the day, following ten men's stories. These men presenting a cross-section of the British Army of 1916 — Regular Army, New Army and Territorial Force — with ranks from privates up to battalion commander (lieutenant colonel).

== Reviews ==
When the book came back into print in 2003, literary editor Benjamin Schwarz wrote in the Atlantic Monthly that The First Day on the Somme "remains one of the most innovative and harrowing works of military history ever written...It's still the definitive account of that day of slaughter, and the most unsentimental yet heartbreaking appreciation of the British infantrymen – stolid, sardonic, comradely – who fought and died in the Great War."

== See also ==
- First day on the Somme
