= The Battle of Hamburg (book) =

- Front cover of the 1981 US edition
- Author: Martin Middlebrook
- Subject: Battle of Hamburg
- Genre: Non-fiction
- Publisher: Allen Lane, Charles Scribner's Sons
- Publication date: 1980, 1981

The Battle of Hamburg, subtitled The Firestorm Raid (UK edition) or Allied Bomber Forces Against a German City in 1943 (US edition), is a book by the British military historian Martin Middlebrook describing the combined RAF Bomber Command and USAAF 8th Air Force attacks on the German city of Hamburg in the summer of 1943.

The raids were carried out under the codename Operation Gomorrah and the initial attack became infamous for creating the phenomenon known as a firestorm, which caused great destruction to the city and its inhabitants.

The book attempts to give a non-partisan account and goes into well researched detail about the raid, which includes interviews with participants from both sides of the battle.
