= 2024 in Spain =

- Decades: 2000s; 2010s; 2020s; 2030s
- See also: History of Spain; Timeline of Spanish history; List of years in Spain

Events in the year 2024 in Spain.

== Incumbents ==
- Monarch – Felipe VI
- Prime Minister – Pedro Sánchez
- President of the Congress of Deputies – Francina Armengol
- President of the Senate – Pedro Rollán
- President of the Supreme Court – Francisco Marín Castán (acting)
- President of the Constitutional Court – Cándido Conde-Pumpido
- Attorney General – Álvaro García Ortiz
- Chief of the Defence Staff – Teodoro Esteban López Calderón
- Sánchez II Government

== Events ==
=== January ===
- 30 January–3 February – Benidorm Fest 2024 (1st semifinal)

=== February ===
- 3 February – 16th Gaudí Awards in Barcelona, Catalonia
- 9 February – Two police officers are killed and two more are injured after a speedboat suspected of belonging to drug smugglers smashes into their patrol craft in the port of Barbate, Andalusia.
- 10 February – 38th Goya Awards in Valladolid, Castile and León
- 18 February – 2024 Galician regional election
- 22 February – 2024 Valencia residential complex fire: At least 10 people are killed in a fire at a 14-storey residential building in Valencia.
- 28 February – An investigation is launched into a corruption scandal involving several political figures and allies of Prime Minister Pedro Sanchez.

=== April ===
- 20 April – 2024 Anti-tourism protests in Spain: Protests occur in Tenerife, Canary Islands, against mass tourism in the Canary Islands which is allegedly increasing house prices for locals.
- 21 April – 2024 Basque regional election
- 24 April – Prime Minister Pedro Sánchez says that he is considering resigning from office after the launch of a judicial investigation into his wife, Begoña Gómez after accusations by a right-wing legal platform. On 29 April, Sánchez withdraws his considerations.

=== May ===
- 3 May – The Spanish government revokes a national award given out since 2011 for bullfighting.
- 12 May – 2024 Catalan regional election: The PSC emerges as the largest party in the Parliament of Catalonia at the expense of separatist parties, who lose their majority.
- 21 May – Spain recalls its ambassador in Argentina after President Javier Milei makes disparaging remarks against Pedro Sánchez and Begoña Gómez during Milei's visit to Spain.
- 22 May – The governments of Norway, Ireland, and Spain announce they will recognise the State of Palestine as a sovereign state starting 28 May, calling for a two-state solution. In response, Israel recalls its ambassadors to these countries.
- 23 May – Four people are killed and 16 others are injured after a building housing a restaurant collapses in Palma de Mallorca.
- 27 May – Prime Minister Pedro Sánchez signs a bilateral security pact with Ukrainian President Volodymyr Zelenskyy and pledges €1 billion (US$1.1 billion) of military aid to Ukraine.
- 28 May – The government officially recognizes the State of Palestine, after declaring their intention to do so on May 22.
- 28 May – Vox leader Santiago Abascal meets with Israeli Prime Minister Benjamin Netanyahu amid the Spanish government's recognition of Palestine.
- 30 May – The Congress of Deputies votes 177-172 to pass a bill granting amnesty for Catalan separatists involved in the 2017 Catalan independence referendum and the ensuing Catalan declaration of independence and political crisis.

=== June ===
- 6 June – South Africa's genocide case against Israel: Spain applies to join South Africa’s case at the International Court of Justice accusing Israel of genocide.
- 9 June – 2024 European Parliament election
- 10 June – A Spanish court sentences three men to eight months in prison for racist chants directed towards Brazilian football player Vinícius Júnior.
- 11 June – 2024 Spain floods.
- 20 June – A cruise ship rescues 68 migrants and recovers five bodies in a wooden dinghy drifting off the Canary Islands.
- June 22 – A group of nuns from the Monastery of Santa Clara (Belorado) are excommunicated by the Catholic Church.

=== July ===
- 9 July – UEFA Euro 2024: In association football, 16-year-old Spanish player Lamine Yamal becomes the youngest goalscorer at a UEFA European Championship tournament after scoring in Spain's 2–1 semi-final win against France.
- 14 July –
  - In tennis, Carlos Alcaraz defeats Novak Djokovic 6-2, 6-2, 7-6^{(7-4)} in the Men's singles final to win his second Wimbledon title and his fourth overall Grand Slam title.
  - In association football, Spain defeats England 2–1 in the final match to win their fourth UEFA European Championship title.
- 15 July – A body believed to be missing 19-year-old Jay Slater from Lancashire, United Kingdom, is found near where he was reported missing in Tenerife, after a 28-day search.
- 16 July –
  - Twenty-five people are injured after a bus carrying textile workers crashes into a tunnel north of Barcelona.
  - An oil spill affecting two kilometers of coastline leads to the closure of three beaches in Valencia.
- 17 July – Prime Minister Pedro Sánchez announces measures to reduce the spread of fake news and harmful content in all forms of media, which the People's Party claims is an act to censor and control critical media.
- 20 July – Thousands of people protest in Palma de Mallorca against overtourism in the country.
- 23 July – The Audiencia Nacional sentences Pompeyo González Pascual to 18 years' imprisonment for sending six letters containing explosives to Prime Minister Pedro Sánchez, the US and Ukrainian embassies, the defence ministry and other military targets nationwide in 2022.
- 25 July – The Spanish General Council of the Judiciary blockade ends.
- 27 July – In association football, Spain defeats the Netherlands 2–1 in the final to win their sixth UEFA Women's Under-19 Championship title.
- 30 July –
  - The National Police announces the arrest of 26 people and the rescue of 32 women following the dismantling of a sex trafficking network that victimised up to 600 women, mostly from Venezuela and Colombia.
  - The Comisión Nacional de los Mercados y la Competencia fines online travel agency Booking.com with a record €413 million fine for "abusing its dominant position" in the past five years.

=== August ===
- 8 August –
  - Carles Puigdemont, the fugitive former President of Catalonia, returns to Spain after seven years in exile in Belgium, arriving in Barcelona. but leaving the country shortly afterward. An agent of the Mossos d'Esquadra is arrested for collaborating in the escape of Puigdemont.
  - 2024 Catalan regional election: Socialists' Party candidate Salvador Illa is elected as the new Catalan government president by the Parliament of Catalonia, becoming the region's first non-separatist president in more than 10 years.
- 18 August – An 11-year old boy is fatally stabbed on a football pitch in Mocejón.

=== September ===
- 3 September – Spanish General Council of the Judiciary blockade: Isabel Perelló is elected as President of the Supreme Court and the General Council of the Judiciary, becoming the first woman to hold those positions.
- 5 September –
  - An oil spill with a length of two kilometers of coastline leads to the closure of four beaches in Gran Canaria.
  - Two people are killed in the collapse of two cranes at the port of Gijón.
- 8 September – Venezuelan opposition leader Edmundo González flees Venezuela to seek political asylum in Spain. The Spanish government says González departed Venezuela on a Spanish Air Force plane at his own request.
- 17 September – The European Court of Human Rights rules that Spain had violated the religious rights of an Ecuadorean resident who was belonged to the Jehovah's Witnesses when doctors performed a blood transfusion on her during an emergency surgery without her consent and orders the Spanish state to pay 26,000 euros in compensation.
- 25 September – Incoming Mexican president Claudia Sheinbaum officially bans King Felipe VI from attending her inauguration on 1 October, citing his failure to apologize for the Spanish conquest in the 1500s. In response, the Spanish government says that it would boycott the event altogether.
- 26 September – An RCD Mallorca fan is sentenced to one year in prison for yelling racist insults at Real Madrid player Vinícius Júnior and Villarreal player Samuel Chukwueze.
- 28 September – A boat carrying migrants capsizes during rescue operations off the coast of El Hierro in the Canary Islands, killing at least nine people and leaving 48 others missing. At least 27 people are rescued.

=== October ===
- 24 October – Íñigo Errejón, the spokesperson of Sumar in the Congress of Deputies, announces his retirement from politics following complaints of sexual violence filed by actress Elisa Mouliaá.
- 30 October – At least 217 people are reported killed following flash floods in the Valencian Community, Andalusia and Castilla–La Mancha.

=== November ===
- 3 November – A delegation consisting of King Felipe VI, Queen Letizia and Prime Minister Sanchez is violently confronted during a meeting with victims of floods in Paiporta, injuring two bodyguards.
- 6 November – Authorities announce the country's largest anti-drug operation, which was launched in October and results in the seizure of 13 tonnes of cocaine hidden on board a cargo ship carrying bananas that arrived in Algeciras from Ecuador in October. The operation also leads to the arrest of Óscar Sánchez Gil, the former head of the economic crimes unit of the National Police Corps and the discovery of €21 million from his residence and office.
- 8 November – Telefónica S.A. agrees to pay $85 million as part of a settlement over a US investigation involving a subsidiary of the firm offering bribes to Venezuelan officials in 2014.
- 15 November – Ten people are killed in a fire at a nursing home in Villafranca de Ebro.
- 22 November – The government imposes a total of 179 million euros ($187 million) in fines on airlines Ryanair, EasyJet, Volotea, Vueling and Norwegian Air for abusive practices such as overcharging, misleading information and lack of price transparency.
- 27 November – Three people are killed and seven others are injured in a boiler explosion at a plastics factory in Ibi.

=== December ===
- 11 December – Spain, Portugal and Morocco win the joint hosting rights for the 2030 FIFA World Cup.
- 24 December – The Russian cargo ship Ursa Major sinks following an engine room explosion in the Mediterranean Sea between Spain and Algeria, leaving two sailors missing. Fourteen others are taken to Cartagena by Spanish rescuers. The ship's owners subsequently blame the sinking on a "terrorist attack".

== Holidays ==
- 1 January - New Year's Day
- 6 January - Epiphany
- 28 March - Maundy Thursday
- 29 March - Good Friday
- 1 April - Easter Monday
- 1 May - International Workers' Day
- 15 August - Assumption Day
- 12 October - National Day of Spain
- 1 November - All Saints' Day
- 6 December – Constitution Day
- 25 December - Christmas Day

== Art and entertainment ==
- List of 2024 box office number-one films in Spain
- List of Spanish films of 2024
- 38th Goya Awards
- Spain in the Eurovision Song Contest 2024

== Deaths ==
=== January ===
- 2 January:
  - Carmen Valero, 68, Olympic middle-distance runner (1976).
  - Ángel Castellanos, 71, Spanish footballer (Valencia, Granada, national team).
- 3 January – Arévalo, 76, Spanish comedian and actor (Moscow Gold).
- 6 January – Pablo Varela Server, 81, Roman Catholic prelate, auxiliary bishop of Panamá (2004–2019).
- 7 January – Arnold Taraborrelli, 92, American-Spanish choreographer.
- 8 January – Ventura Pons, 78, film director (Anita Takes a Chance, Food of Love).
- 9 January – Santiago López Valdivielso, 73, politician and businessman, director-general of the Civil Guard (1996–2004) and deputy (1986–1996).
- 10 January – César Alierta, 78, telecommunications executive, CEO of Telefónica (2000–2016).
- 12 January – Luis García Mosquera, 77, footballer (Deportivo La Coruña, Getafe Deportivo).
- 13 January:
  - Miguel Barroso Ayats, 70, journalist (El País) and political advisor, secretary of state for press (2004–2005).
  - Juli Mira, 74, actor (The Sea, Voices in the Night, The 7th Day).
  - Laureano Rubial, 76, footballer (Real Zaragoza, Pontevedra, UP Langreo).
- 14 January:
  - Ricardo Alós, 92, footballer (Sporting de Gijón, Valencia, Real Murcia).
  - Luís Torras, 111, painter.
- 15 January:
  - Carles Falcón, 45, rally driver (2024 Dakar Rally).
  - Anita Sirgo, 93, trade unionist and anti-Francoist militant (Asturian miners' strike of 1962).
- 16 January: José Lifante, 80, actor (Spanish Fly, Butterfly on the Shoulder, National Heritage)
- 18 January: Trini Tinturé, 88, cartoonist and illustrator.
- 19 January:
  - Ester Xargay Melero, 63, poet, video artist and translator.
  - José Antonio Jiménez Jiménez, 71, boxer, European featherweight champion (1973–1975).
- 20 January: Maite Idirin, Basque singer.
- 22 January: Martí, 68–69, comics artist.
- 24 January: Ángel María de Pablos, 81, journalist (El Mundo, El Norte de Castilla), poet and writer.
- 26 January: Josep Alegre i Vilas, 83, Roman Catholic monk, abbot of the Royal Abbey of Santa Maria de Poblet (1998–2015).
- 27 January: Eugenio Nasarre, 77, politician and civil servant, director general of RTVE (1982) and deputy (2000–2015).
- 29 January: Louis Colombani, 92, French politician.

=== February ===
- 2 February: Lorenzo Olarte Cullen, 91, politician, president of the Canary Islands (1988–1991).
- 3 February: Ángel Franco Martínez, 85, football referee.
- 14 February: Camila Cañeque, 39, performance artist and philosopher.

=== April ===
- 23 April: Mayte Méndez, basketball coach.

=== May ===
- 5 May: Isabel Miralles González, academic.

=== August ===
- 19 August: Maria Branyas, 117, American-born supercentenarian, world's oldest person.

=== October ===
- 24 October: Juliana Panizo Rodríguez, 77, Spanish academic (University of Valladolid).

=== December ===
- 14 December: Isak Andic, 71, Turkish-born businessman, founder and chairman of Mango.
- 17 December: Marisa Paredes, 78, actress (Turnip Top, The Flower of My Secret, Life Is Beautiful).

== See also ==
- 2024 in the European Union
- 2024 in Europe
- 2024 in Spanish television
