= Canary Islands Network for Protected Natural Areas =

Conservation organization based in the Canary Islands

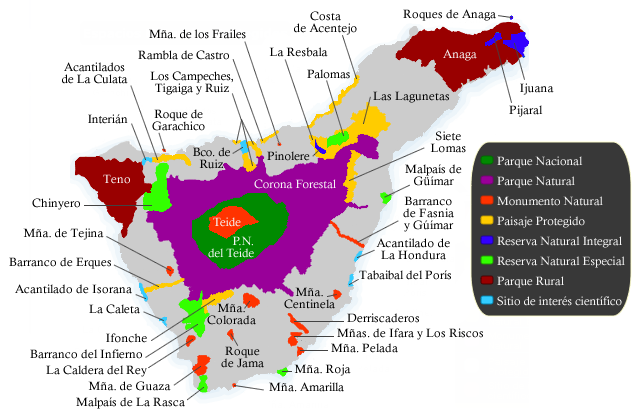
Map showing the classification of protected areas in Tenerife

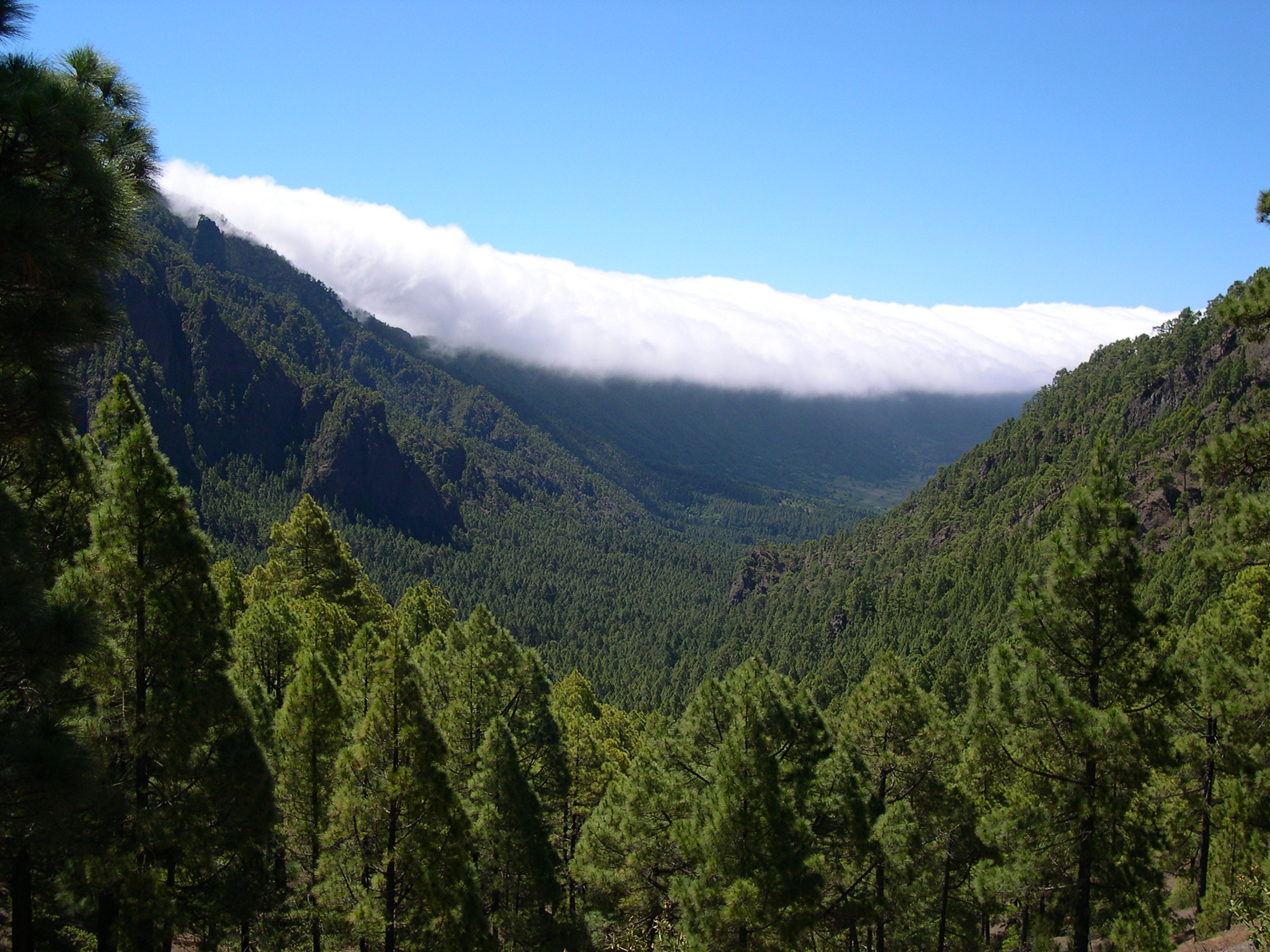
Caldera de Taburiente National Park, under control of the group

The Canary Islands Network for Protected Natural Areas (Red Canaria de Espacios Naturales Protegidos) is a conservation organization in the Canary Islands.

It recognizes 146 areas across the islands of Tenerife, Gran Canaria, La Palma and Fuerteventura as under protection. Of the 146 protected sites under control of network in the Canary Islands archipelago, a total of 43 are located in Tenerife, the most protected island in the group.

== Criteria ==
The network has criteria, which places areas under its observation under eight different categories of protection. These include:

1. National park
2. Natural park
3. National monument
4. Protected area
5. Integral nature reserve
6. Special natural reserve
7. Rural park
8. Site of scientific Interest

== See also ==
- Tourism in the Canary Islands
- Marine life of the Canary Islands
- Geography of the Canary Islands
