= Asturian miners' strike =

Asturian miners' strike may refer to:

- Asturian miners' strike of 1934
- 2012 Asturian miners' strike
