= Marine life of the Canary Islands =

The marine life found in the Canary Islands is interesting, being a combination of North Atlantic, Mediterranean, and endemic species. In recent years, the increasing popularity of both scuba diving and underwater photography have provided biologists with much new information on the marine life of the islands.

Fish species found in the islands include many species of shark, ray, moray eel, bream, jack, grunt, scorpionfish, triggerfish, grouper, goby, and blenny. In addition, there are many invertebrate species including octopus, cuttlefish, sponge, jellyfish, anemone, crab, mollusc, sea urchin, starfish, sea cucumber, and coral.

== Marine turtles ==
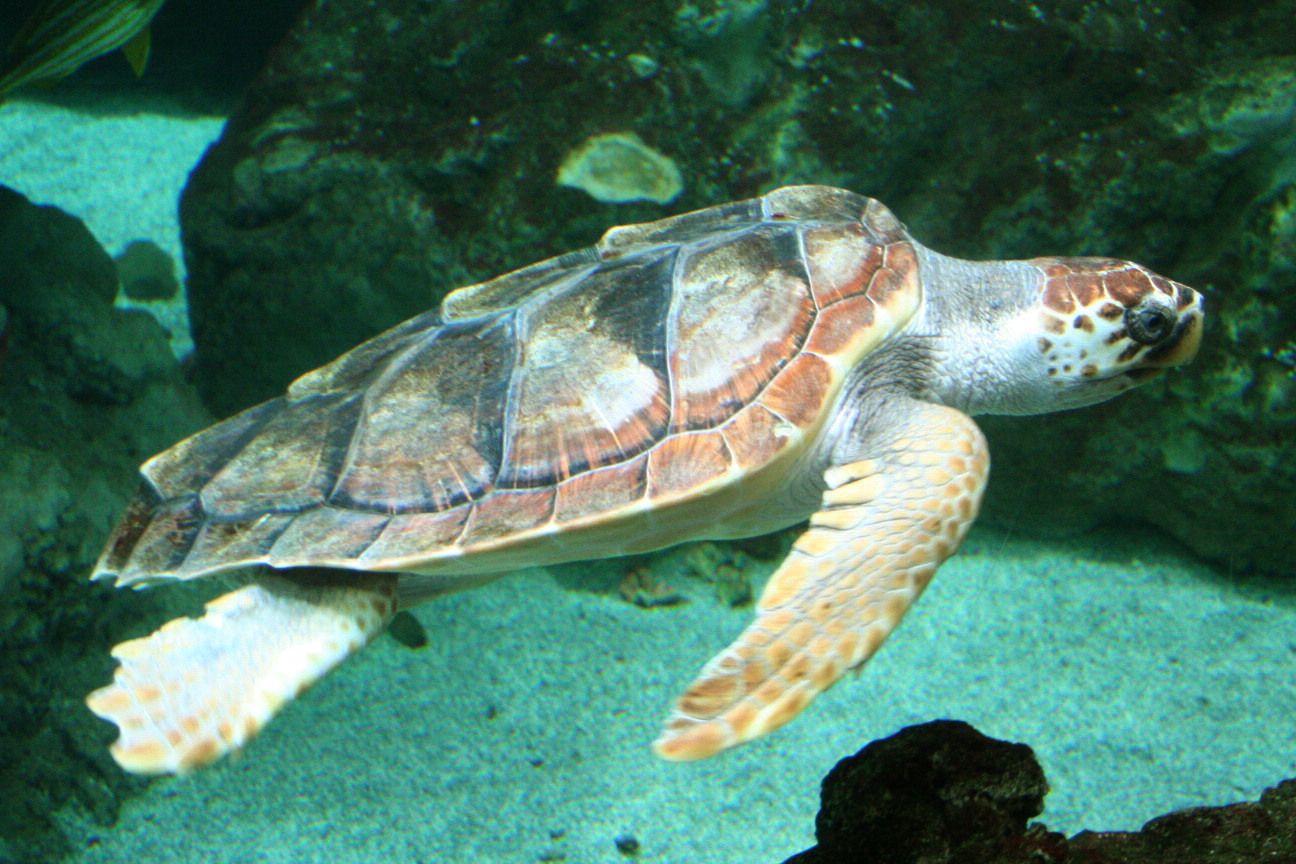
A hawksbill turtle, one of the marine turtle species found in the Canary Islands

Five species of marine turtle are present in the archipelago: the loggerhead (the most common species), green, hawksbill, leatherback, and Kemp's ridley turtle. None of these species are known to breed in the islands, so those seen in the water are usually migrating. However, it is believed that some of these species may have bred in the islands in the past, and there are records of several sightings of leatherback turtle on beaches in Fuerteventura, adding credibility to the theory.

== Sea urchins ==
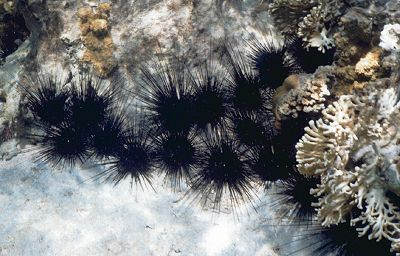
The lime urchin, rapidly becoming overabundant in the Canary Islands due to fishing of its natural predators.

By far the most commonly seen invertebrate in Canary Island waters, the lime urchin is an important herbivore. Populations of these creatures have increased rapidly within recent years, primarily due to overfishing of their natural predators, such as starfish, triggerfish and Triton's trumpet. In areas with many of these creatures, the seabed can become completely stripped of algae. As a response to this "ecological emergency", widespread culling of sea urchins has been advocated in some areas.

== Marine mammals ==
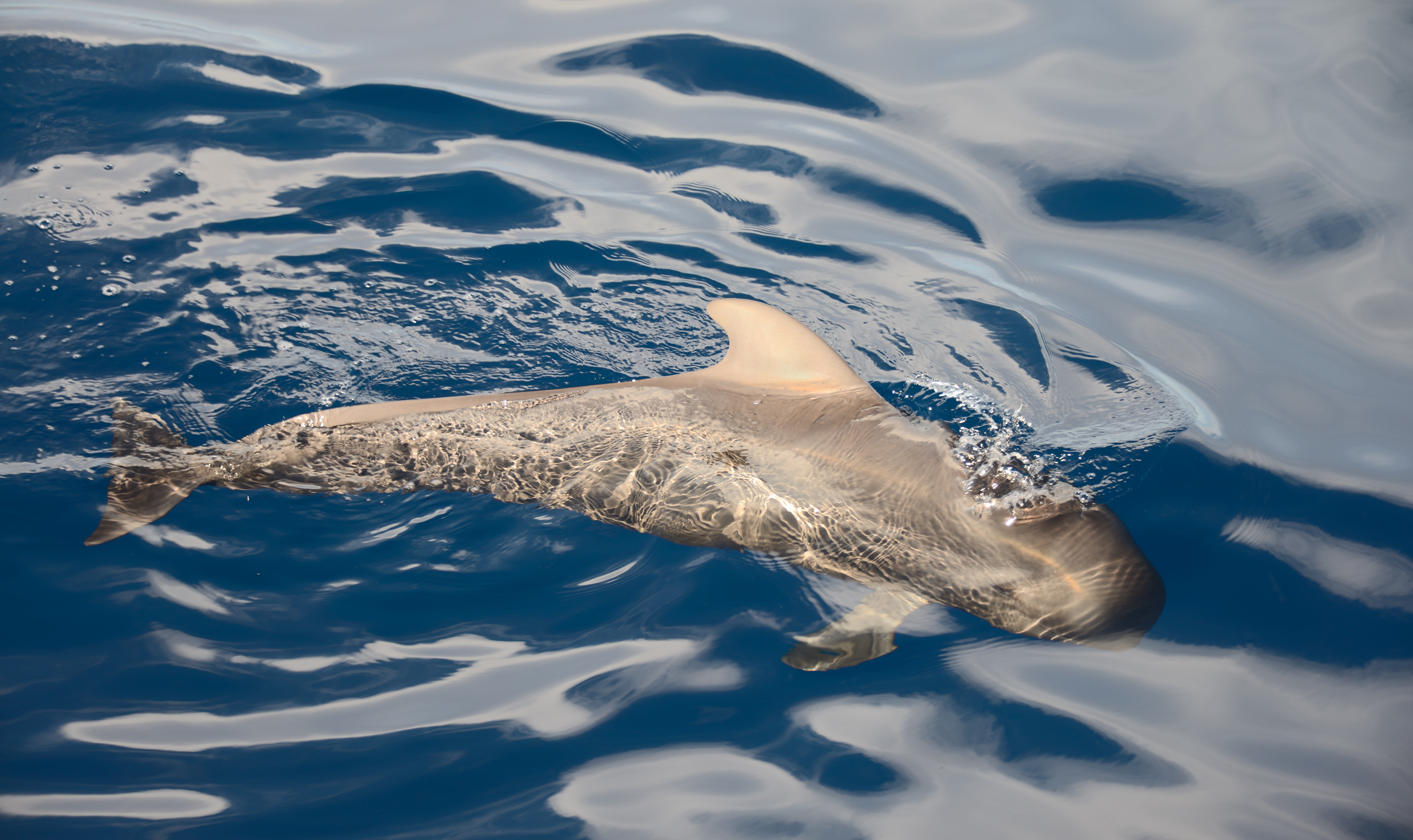
Pilot whales around Canary Islands are particularly known to be curious and friendly to humans.

Marine mammals of the Canary Islands include varieties of cetaceans, such as rorquals (not much known about their distributions in northeastern Atlantic), sperm whales, Kogia, little known beaked whales, orcas, the short-finned pilot whales, false killer whales, Risso's dolphins, common and bottlenose dolphins. Vagrant hooded seals also appear every now and again. In 1995, continuous observations of North Atlantic right whale, being considered as functionally extinct in eastern North Atlantic were made, followed by another possible sighting off La Gomera between 1998 and 1999. The Canary Islands were also formerly home to a population of the rarest pinniped in the world, the Mediterranean monk seal.

== Sharks ==
Tenerife and Gran Canaria are one of the few remaining locations with a substantial population of angelsharks. It is quite a common sight while snorkeling.

The basking shark, a harmless plankton feeder, visits the island in large groups during the winter, but is rarely seen.

The common smooth-hound comes close to shore in the late summer to breed, but is too small to be dangerous to humans.

The hammerhead shark (Sphyrna zygaena) is another fish eater, and is sometimes encountered while fishing.

== Native fauna gallery ==
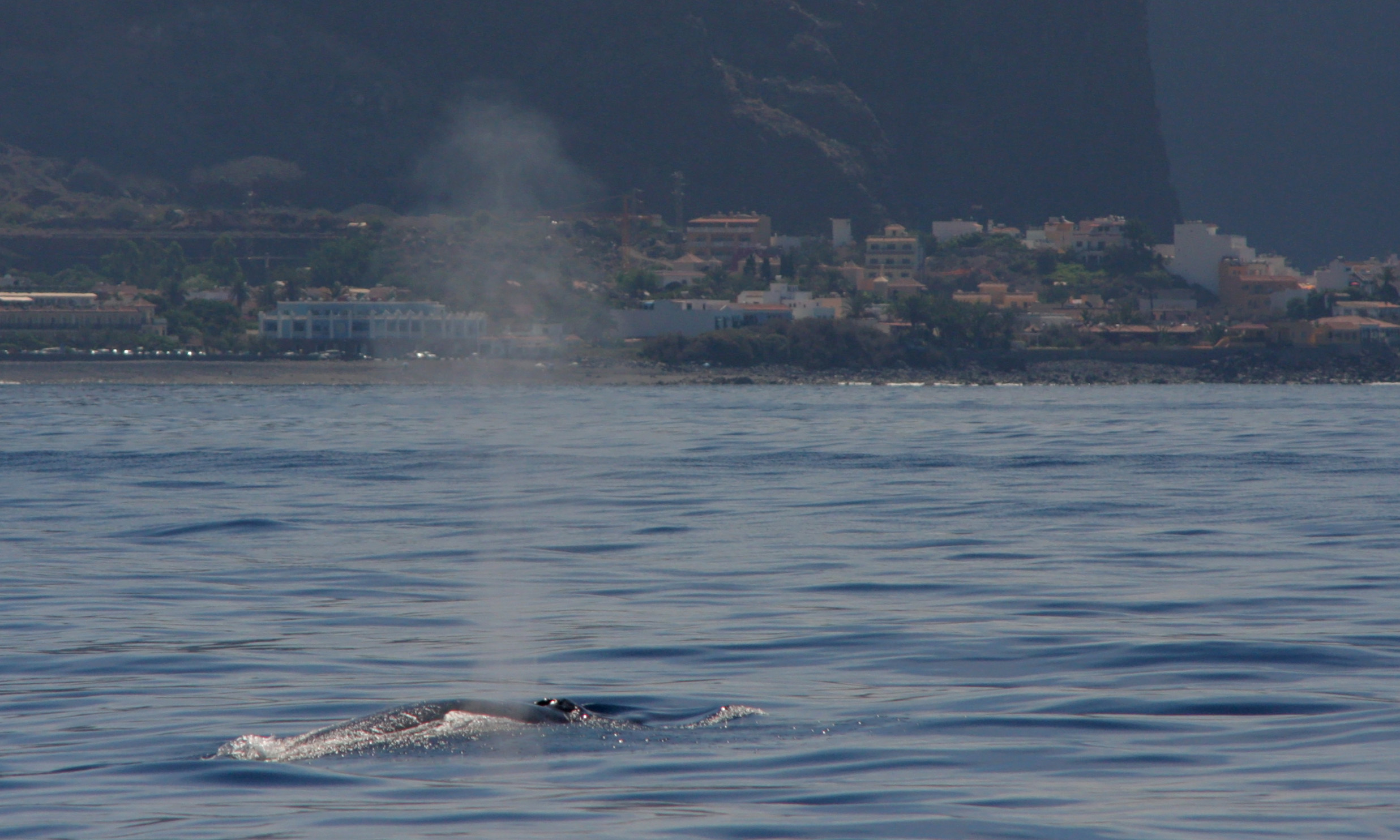
Bryde's whale off La Gomera

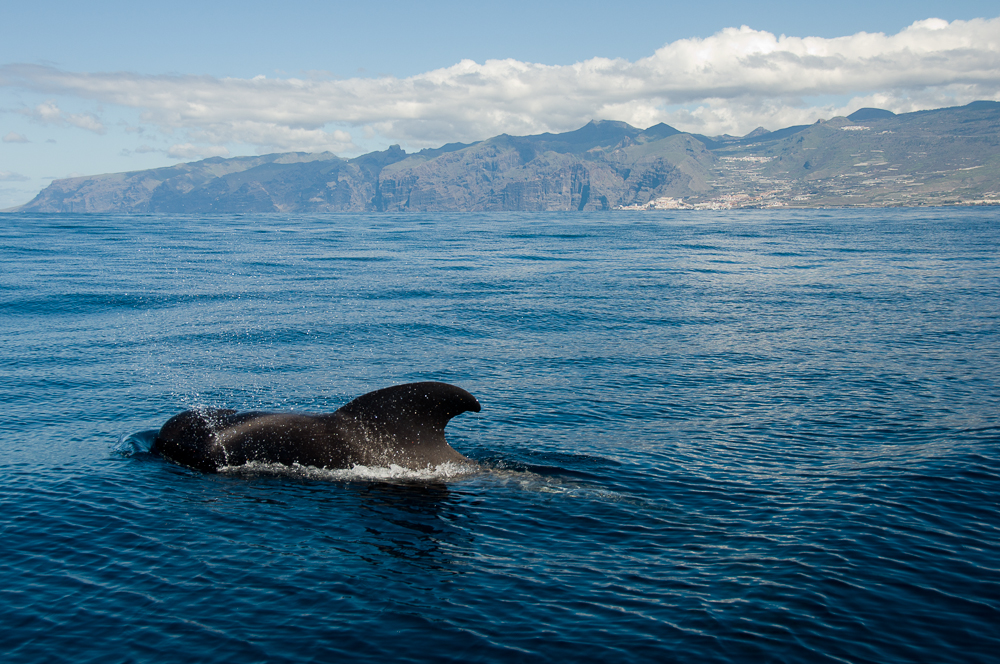
Short-finned pilot whale off Tenerife

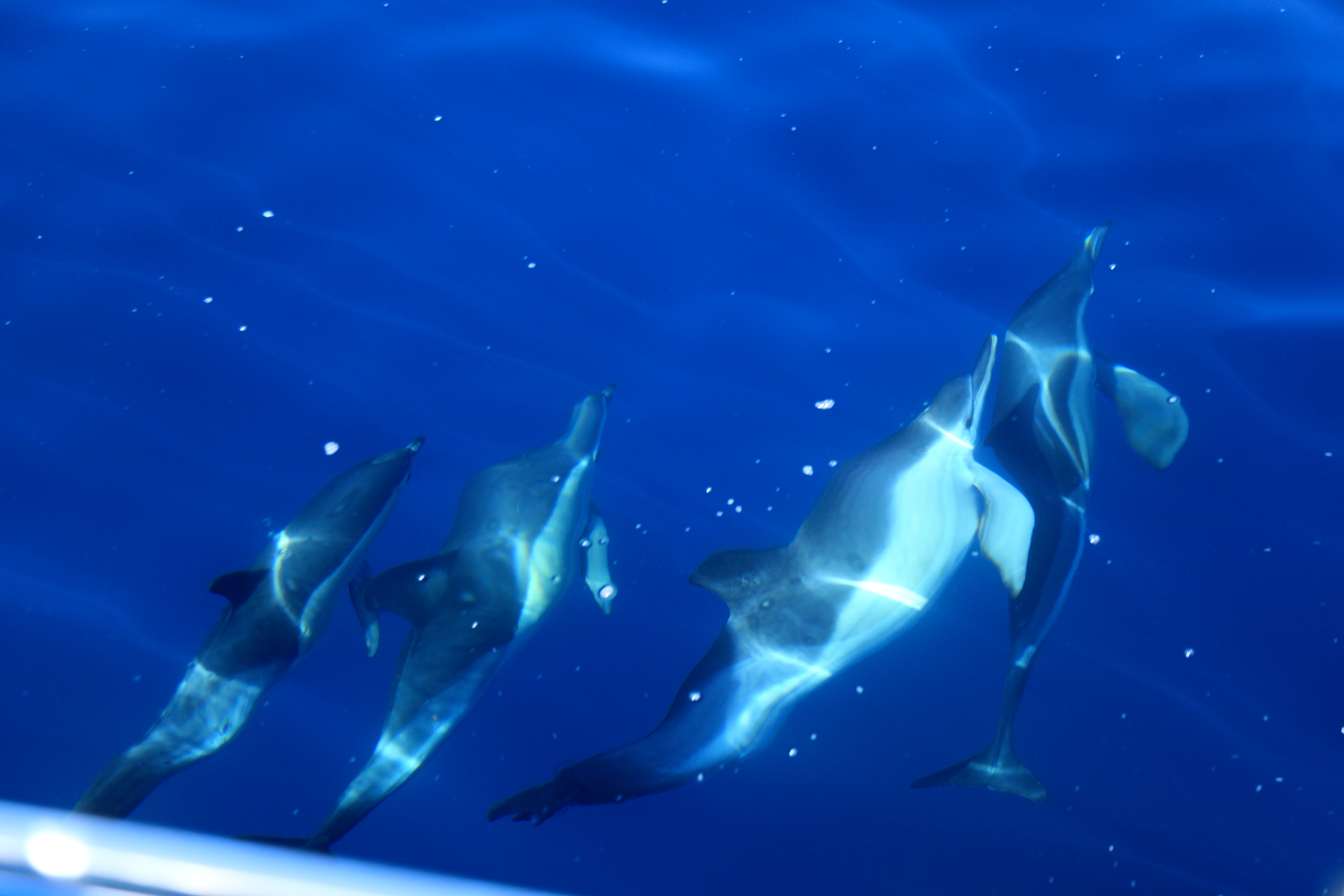
Common dolphins off La Palma

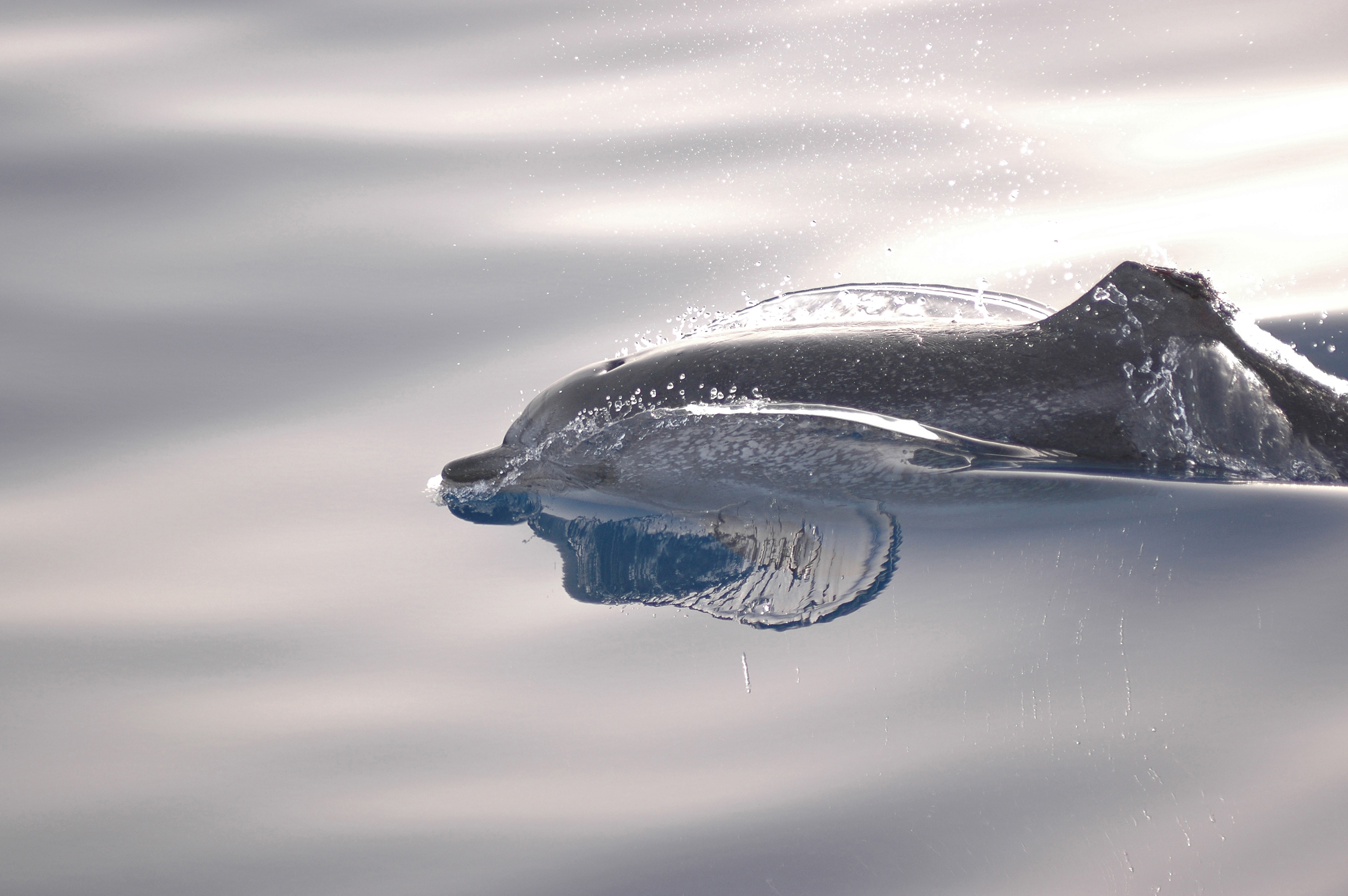
Injured striped dolphin off La Gomera

== Marine life and tourism ==
Marine life, particularly cetaceans are one of the main attractions of Tenerife and the other islands, generating jobs and letting tourists enjoy the marvelous sea life of the area.

== See also ==
- Tourism in the Canary Islands
- Canary Islands Network for Protected Natural Areas
- Geography of the Canary Islands

== Gallery ==
- Whale watching in Spain
- Mammals of the Canary Islands
- Delphinidae of La Palma on Wikimedia Commons.]
