= Juliana Panizo Rodríguez =

Spanish academic (1947–2024)

- Born: 15 January 1947; Barcial de la Loma, Spain
- Died: 24 October 2024 (aged 77); Valladolid, Spain
- Occupation: Academic

Juliana Panizo Rodríguez (15 January 1947 – 24 October 2024) was a Spanish academic who was a researcher at the University of Valladolid between 1985 and 2003.

She was also a paremiologist, linguist and pedagogue who was author of, among other works, the Castilian thematic proverb book.

== Biography ==
Juliana Panizo Rodríguez was born on 15 January 1947 in Barcial de la Loma (Valladolid). She held a PhD in Hispanic Philology from the University of Valladolid and worked as a professor of Spanish Language at the Faculty of Education of the same university.

Her undergraduate thesis dealt with popular speech in Tierra de Campos, which sparked an initial interest in phraseology and paremiology, which increased with her doctoral thesis: Exclamatory, appellative and oath formulas in Spanish literature.

Although she had already carried out some popular work, her contact with Joaquin Diaz González, with whom she had a strong friendship, led her to publish numerous articles in the Revista de Folklore from 1983 onwards, which have been basic for subsequent studies by other scholars of popular culture.

She retired early in 2005 and lived for a few years in her home town of Barcial de la Loma, where she continued his research and dissemination of Castilian folklore and culture by publishing articles in regional media.

From 2012 until her death she lived in a residence in Valladolid where she used her experience as a teacher and expert in literature and popular culture to help with various charitable and motivational tasks for people with disabilities.

She was the author of several books and numerous articles.

She died in Valladolid on 24 October 2024 and was buried in her hometown, Barcial de la Loma.

== Line of research ==
For many years she worked directly with informants of all ages, "from twenty-four to ninety-six years old," information that contrasted with the classic compilations of Spanish proverbs.

She later classified these proverbs by themes, giving rise to the Castilian Thematic Proverb Book, a unique work within Castilian ethnography, with the aim of preserving those proverbs that were in danger of disappearing due to the substantial change in the agricultural society that originated them.

== Awards and recognitions ==
In 2008 she received the Diez por Diez award from Tierra de Campos in the Literature category.

== Works ==
- Los refranes, Valladolid: Obra Cultural de la Caja de Ahorros Popular, 1987, col. Cuadernos Vallisoletanos, n.º 38.
- Enseñanza, aprendizaje y contenidos en los refranes castellanos, Valladolid: Universidad de Valladolid, Secretariado de Publicaciones e Intercambio Científico, 1998.
- El habla de Tierra de Campos, Valladolid: Diputación de Valladolid, 1998.
- Habla y cultura populares de Castilla y León, Valladolid (Rúa Oscura, 4): J. Panizo, 1999.
- Cancionero temático popular, Valladolid (Rúa Oscura, 4): J. Panizo, 1999.
- Refranero temático castellano, Valladolid: Universidad de Valladolid. Secretariado de Publicaciones e Intercambio Editorial, 1999.
- Dichos y otras expresiones coloquiales, Valladolid: J. Panizo, 1999 (Valladolid : Gráf. Andrés Martín).
- Las virtudes en el refranero, Valladolid: J. Panizo, 2000 (Valladolid: MATA), 47 pp.
