= Barcial de la Loma =

Coordinates: 41°57′N 5°17′W

Barcial de la Loma, Spain
- Coat of arms

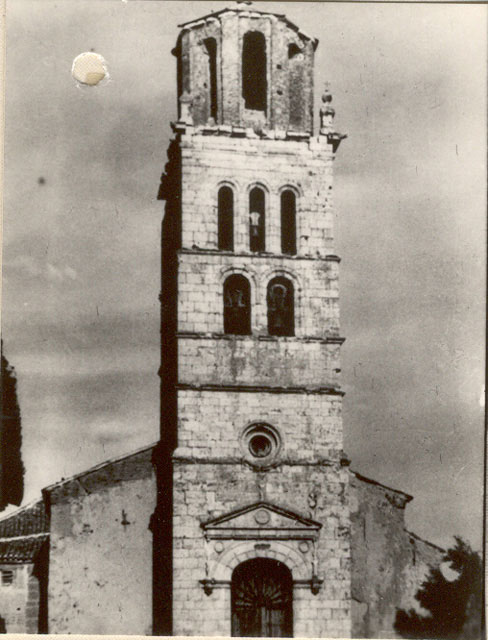
- Church of San Pelayo
- Country: Spain
- Autonomous community: Castile and León
- Province: Valladolid
- Municipality: Barcial de la Loma

Area
  - Total: 27.28 km^{2} (10.53 sq mi)
- Elevation: 744 m (2,441 ft)

Population (2025-01-01)
  - Total: 98
  - Density: 3.6/km^{2} (9.3/sq mi)
- Time zone: UTC+1 (CET)
  - Summer (DST): UTC+2 (CEST)

Barcial de la Loma is a municipality located in the province of Valladolid, Castile and León, Spain. According to the 2004 census (INE), the municipality has a population of 151 inhabitants.

== History ==
The town, which already existed in 1095 (Barceale de Lomba), benefited from the jurisdiction granted in 1197 by the Alfonso de León monarch to Castroverde de Campos (Zamora). Its tower or fortress was under the orders of the Holy Board during the War of the Communities .

Striking with the province of Zamora, if we approach from Villafrechós we will see how the monotony of the cereal fields is broken by some mass of pine trees.
