= Luís Torras =

Spanish Galician painter (1912–2024)

- Born: Luís Torras Martínez; 29 December 1912; Vigo, Galicia, Spain
- Died: 14 January 2024 (aged 111 years, 16 days)
- Education: Escuela Superior de Bellas Artes de San Fernando
- Known for: Painter
- Spouse: María Incera Cruz (m. 1946; died 2023)
- Children: 1

Luís Torras Martínez (29 December 1912 – 14 January 2024) was a Spanish painter and supercentenarian, with a permanent exhibition in Casa das Artes.

== Biography ==
Torras was born in Calle Alfonso XIII in Vigo on 29 December 1912. He studied at the College of the Marist Brothers. He then worked in the family cherry business. He learned to draw in an academy in Vigo. In, Torras moved to Madrid to attend the Real Academia de Bellas Artes de San Fernando. The outbreak of the Spanish Civil War took him home from summer leave. Conscripted into the army, he was wounded in combat by two bullets, which left him permanently deaf. In 1941, he returned to Madrid and obtained the title of drawing teacher, working first there and from 1954 at the Escola Municipal de Artes e Oficios de Vigo. Torres married María Jesús Incera Cruz in 1946 and the couple had a son, also named Luis.

A solitary artist, Torras did not involve himself in cenacles and competitions. Torras partook in few exhibitions, some in Vigo and other cities in Spain. He was the subject of an anthological exhibition at the García Barbón Theater in , an institution for which he worked in the sixties, and also took part in the Pontevedra Biennale. It began in a figurative realism and evolved into a synthesis of exquisite invoice, of which the best reference could be Pancho Cossío, for the cleanliness and play of lights of his still lifes, until moving to a landscape of "Fauve" ancestry. The elements of nature are synthesized in his landscapes. He was also a portraitist.

Torras' paintings can be found in the Raíña Sofía Museum, in the Afundación Collection, in the Municipal Museum of Quiñones de León, in the Provincial Museum of Pontevedra, in the Galician Center for Contemporary Art, in private collections and, mainly, in the Casa das Artes de Vigo, where he has an extensive permanent exhibition, the Torras Collection, made up of 67 paintings, created by the Vigo City Council in , Torras finished runner-up. In the National of Fine Arts of he was awarded the third medal. In the first Unión Fenosa contest, he was distinguished with the acquisition of a landscape. On 23 August 2023, he became the oldest person in Galicia.

Torras died on 14 January 2024, at the age of 111 years, 16 days. His wife had died months before.
