= Mayte Méndez =

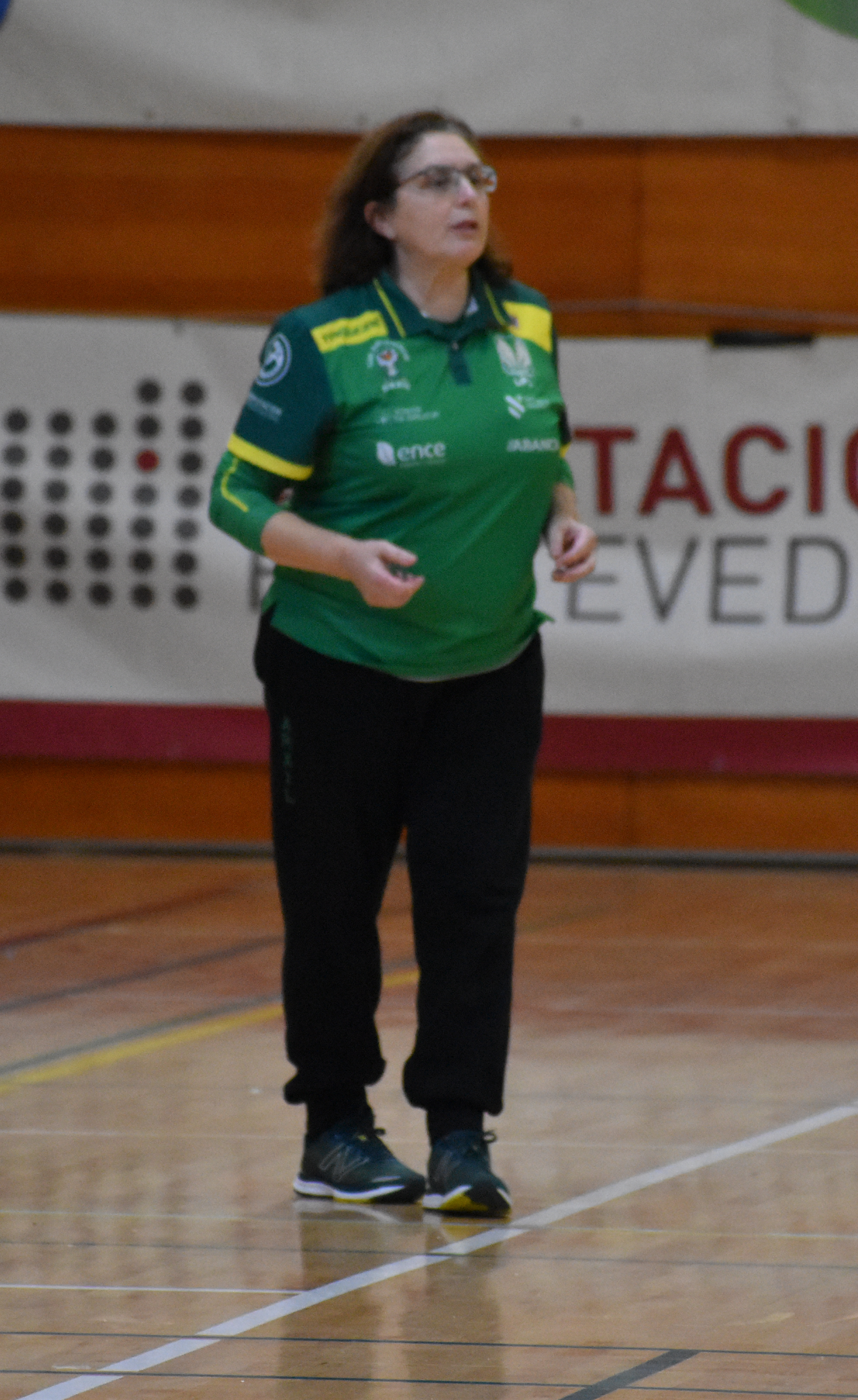
- Born: 9 May 1961; Pontevedra
- Died: 23 April 2024 (aged 62); Pontevedra
- Occupation: basketball coach

Mayte Méndez (9 May 1961 – 23 April 2024) was a Spanish basketball coach.

== Biography ==
Méndez joined the Arxil Basketball Club as a player in 1984. She worked as a coach and educator for over 40 years. Méndez was one of the biggest promoters of the sport in Galicia. She died in April 2024 due to vascular issues.
