= Camila Cañeque =

Spanish performance and conceptual artist (1984–2024)

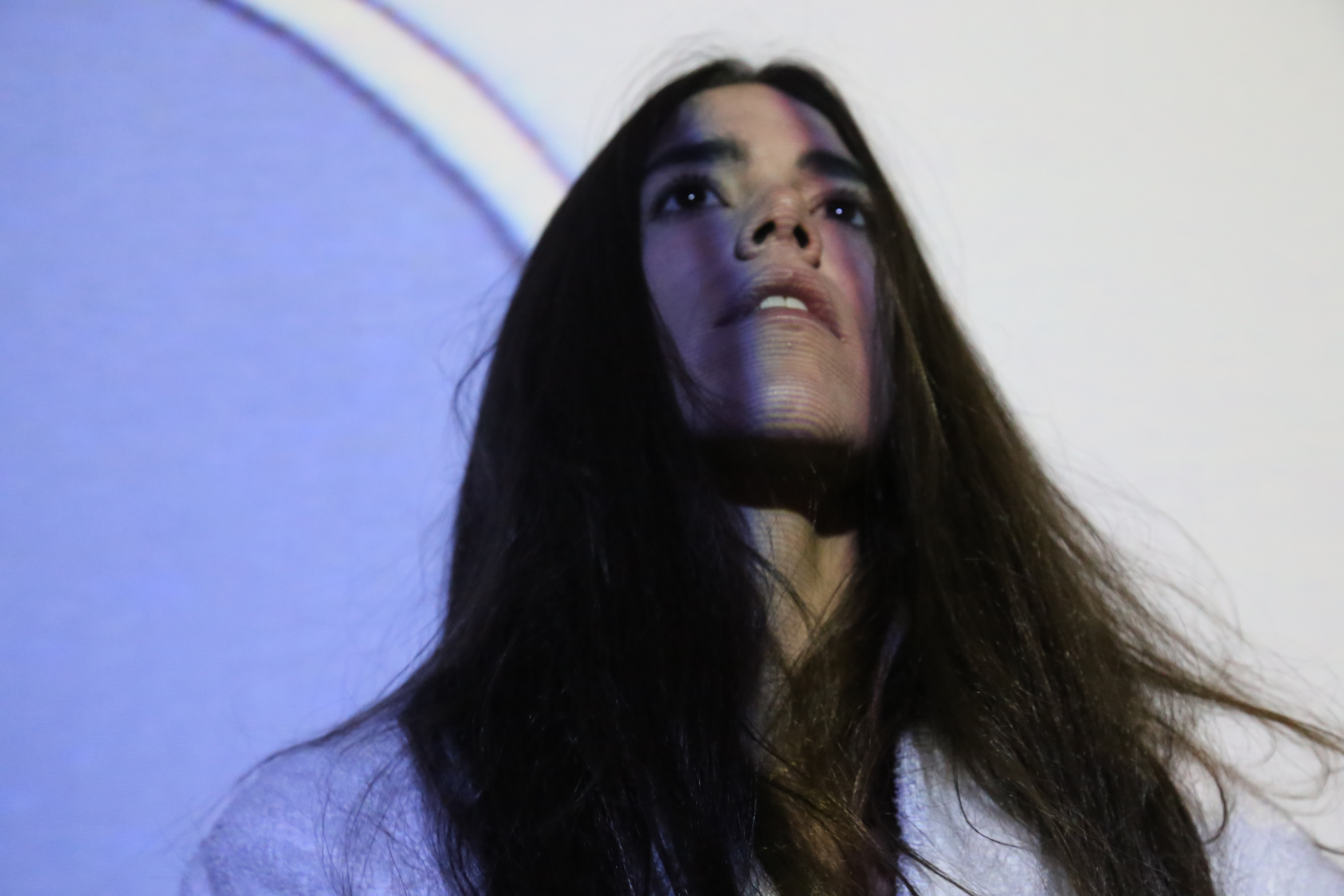
- Born: 15 June 1984; Barcelona, Spain
- Died: 14 February 2024 (aged 39)
- Education: Pompeu Fabra University
- Alma mater: Universidad Carlos III de Madrid, Humanities
- Known for: Performance art, writing
- Notable work: La última frase
- Awards: Zenda Ópera Prima 2023-2024 Award
- Website: https://camilacaneque.com/

Camila Cañeque (June 15, 1984 – February 14, 2024) was a philosopher, conceptual and performance artist from Barcelona. Her work critiqued modernity and existential fatigue. Her work explored the concept of unproductivity, inefficiency and the unfinished in a chaotic world.

== Background ==
Cañeque was born in Barcelona to parents Montse González Xicota and Ramón Cañeque.

Cañeque's early work involved inserting herself passively into spaces in character, investigating inaction. Her work has been described as sarcastic, and often with a dark sense of humor, exploring themes such as inaction and rebellion of a consumerist society.

In 2013, she gained attention for a surprise performance piece at Madrid's ARCO Contemporary art fair where she appeared lying on the ground in a flamenco dress surrounded by flowers and verses by Lorca. Her motionless performance, performance Dead end at the fair interrupted proceedings and sought to symbolize the "death of Spain". The fair censored her performance. Prior to exhibiting performance Dead end, Cañeque toured the United States dressed as a flamenco dancer for Souvenir, a critique on tourism.

Cañeque would go on to exhibit her work internationally in New York, Brazil and across Europe.

In 2019, she received a residency to develop new performance artworks at Mana Contemporary, for their Mana Contemporary x Secret Project Robot residency program. Cañeque did not consider herself a studio based artist. While in the United States, Cañeque described her residency as a "RETREAT" where she developed installations exploring the "gymnastics of stillness".

She died in her sleep unexpectedly at age 39. |At the time of her death, she was finishing her first book La última frase, a treatise on the final endings of texts, in an exploration of the outcome of things. The book would be published posthumously.

== Honours ==
In March 2024, Spanish artist Marc Montijano distributed poems by Lorca in a tribute to Cañeque at Madrid's ARCO art fair, similarly without permission from the fair's organizers.

In November 2024, she was posthumously awarded the Zenda Ópera Prima 2023-2024 Award for La última frase.

== Bibliography ==
- La última frase, Camila Cañeque. Published April 2024 by La Uña Rota. ISBN 978-8418782459
