= Isabel Miralles González =

Spanish academic

- Died: 5 May 2024
- Occupation: Academic

Isabel Miralles González (died 5 May 2024) was a Spanish academic.

== Biography ==
Miralles was a professor of Civil Law at the University of Barcelona until her retirement. She was secretary-general of the university between 2012 and 2016. In 1996, she became the first collaborating professor of Civil Law at the Law and Political Science Studies (EDCP) department at the Open University of Catalonia. She was secretary-general of the university between 2012 and 2016.

Miralles González was killed in May 2024 in a road traffic accident.
