= Villafranca de Ebro =

Coordinates: 41°36′N 0°39′W

- municipality
- Flag Coat of arms
- Interactive map of Villafranca de Ebro
- Country: Spain
- Autonomous community: Aragon
- Province: Zaragoza

Area
  - Total: 63.6 km^{2} (24.6 sq mi)
- Elevation: 176 m (577 ft)

Population (2025-01-01)
  - Total: 828
  - Density: 13.0/km^{2} (33.7/sq mi)
- Time zone: UTC+1 (CET)
  - Summer (DST): UTC+2 (CEST)

Villafranca de Ebro is a municipality located in the province of Zaragoza, Aragon, Spain. According to the 2004 census (INE), the municipality has a population of 684 inhabitants.

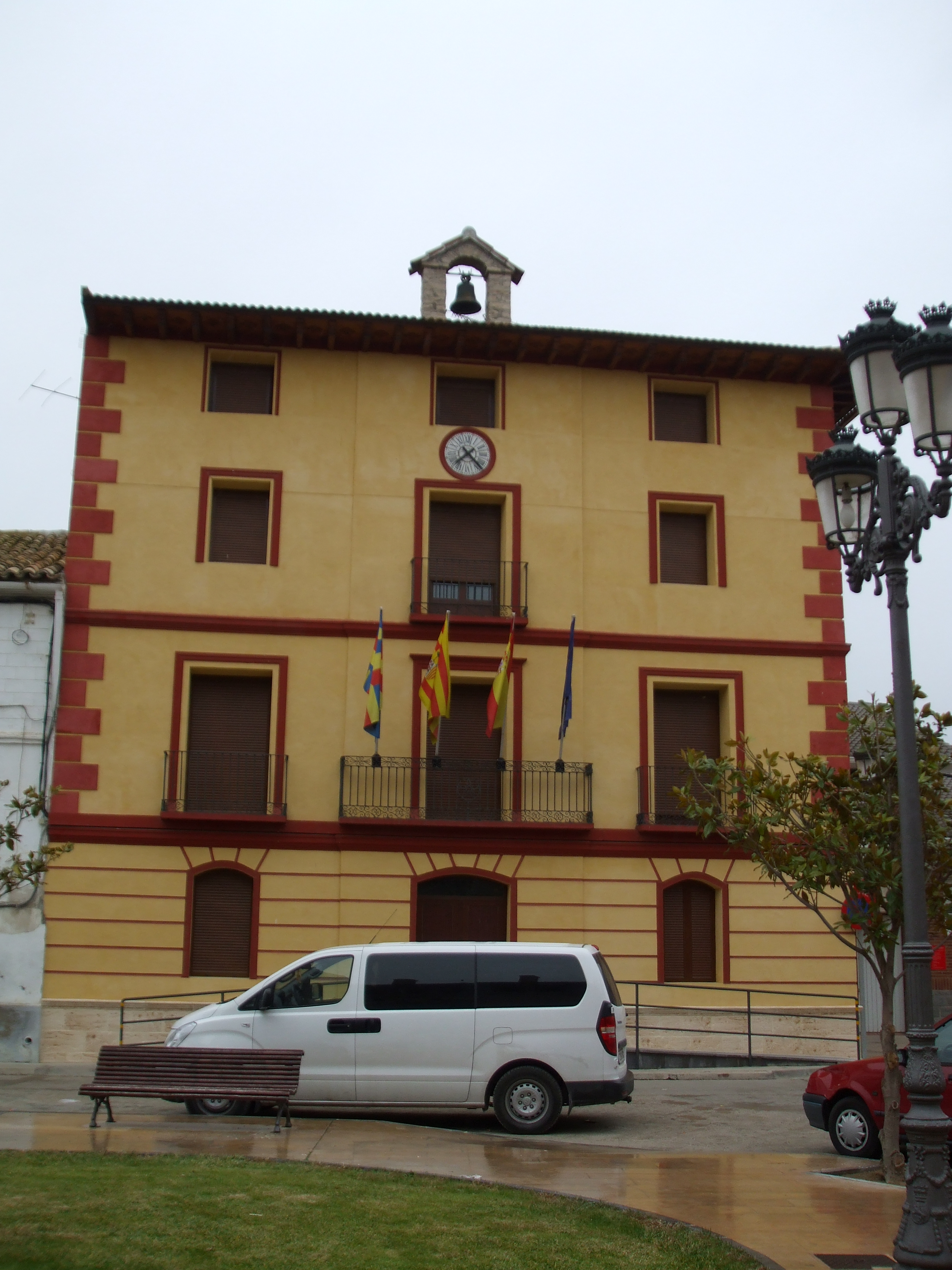
Villafranca de Ebro Town Hall

== See also ==
- List of municipalities in Zaragoza
