= Mocejón =

- Municipality
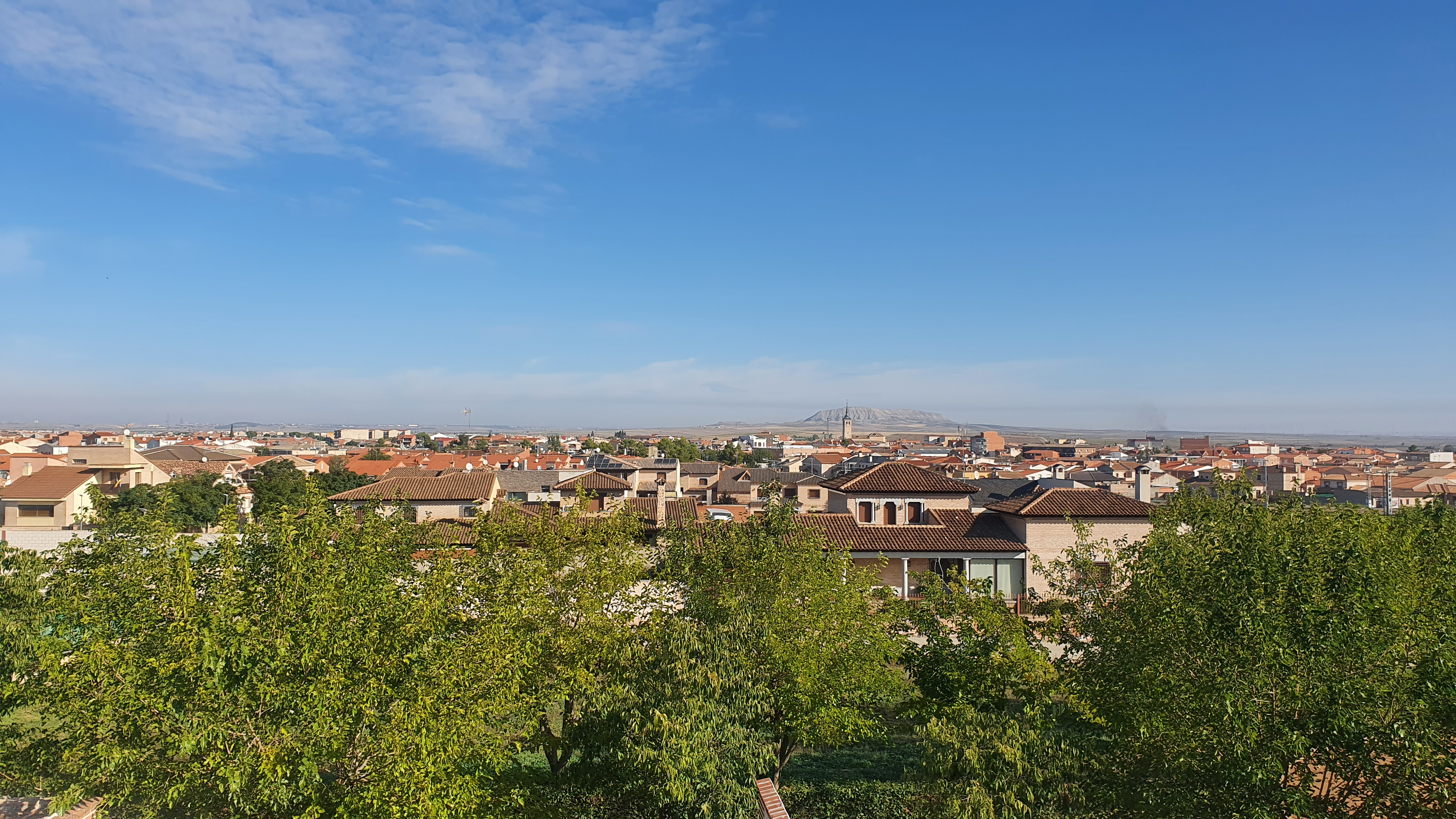

- Coat of arms

- Location in Spain Mocejón (Spain)
- Coordinates: 39°56′13″N 3°55′10″W
- Country: Spain
- Autonomous community: Castilla–La Mancha
- Province: Toledo

Area
  - Total: 30 km^{2} (12 sq mi)
- Elevation: 480 m (1,570 ft)

Population (2025-01-01)
  - Total: 5,188
  - Density: 170/km^{2} (450/sq mi)
- Time zone: UTC+1 (CET)
  - Summer (DST): UTC+2 (CEST)

Mocejón is a municipality located in the province of Toledo, Castile-La Mancha, Spain. According to the 2006 census (INE), the municipality has a population of 4,963 inhabitants. It belongs to the region of La Sagra. It stands at about 480 metres above mean sea level.

By 1166, the hamlet of Mocejón was donated by Alfonso VIII to the knight Pedro Rodríguez de Azagra.
