= Asturian miners' strike of 1962 =

Major labor strike in 1962 in Spain

The Asturias miners' strike of 1962 (also known as la huelgona (from huelga, the Spanish word for strike) or the strike of silence) took place in the spring of 1962, during the Francoist dictatorship. The strike ended two months after it had started, having achieved some of its aims. Many miners were tortured and exiled to other Spanish provinces, and the government instituted a harsh repression. Sympathy strikes took place in other parts of Spain and in other countries.

== Social and economic background ==
In 1959, the so-called Stabilization Plan began in Spain, which deregulated the Spanish economy and seriously harmed mining, which had not received new investments since the end of the 19th century. This led to a wave of wage reductions, which in turn led to the nationalization of mining companies. This caused the economic benefits of past mining activity to be privatized, while its contemporary losses were assumed by the majority of the population. Moreover, the perception of the Franco regime as "archaic" by young people who had not lived through the Civil War or the repression that followed it served to strengthen the labor movement.

== The strike ==
=== Background ===
In 1957 and 1958, strikes took place at the Pozo María Luisa and at the La Nueva coal mines. However, in 1962, eight miners were fired from the Pozo Nicolasa mine, in Mieres, for protesting the harsh working conditions. This, along with the poor living conditions in the mining basin and the willingness of young people to confront the regime, was the trigger for the strike.

=== Development of the strike ===
Thus, on the morning of April 6, 1962, the dismissal of the eight miners was communicated to their colleagues. As a measure of solidarity, the miners at the Nicolasa pit refused to work, resulting in another 25 miners being fired some days later. Thus began the major strike, which came to mobilize nearly 65,000 workers in various industries in Asturias. The strike of 1962 was known as the "Silent strike" because it took place in a peaceful and silent manner. This surprised the authorities, who were more accustomed to an aggressive attitude by the Asturian miners. The strikers' solidarity contributed to the continuation of the strike; for example, free children's canteens were set up.

However, after the first month of the strike, the situation became more complicated, with families struggling to survive; as a result, some workers tried to return to the mine. It was then that some women members of the Communist Party decided to help in the continuation of the strike and organizing of pickets, as well as transmitting information to the rest of the women so that the strike could continue. The role of women was fundamental in creating solidarity networks, asking for food and achieving the means of survival for the strikers and their families when it seemed that the strike was going to fail.

=== Conclusion ===
Between June 4 and 7, 1962, the strike gradually ceased and the workers returned to their posts. The then General Minister of the Movimiento Nacional, José Solís Ruiz, negotiated directly with the strikers. Part of the demands were granted: there were salary improvements, revaluation of pensions, annulment of some sanctions and freedom for the detainees. It was the only occasion during the Franco regime in which, since the right to strike was prohibited, a minister negotiated directly with the strikers and not with the Spanish Syndical Organization.

Several of the workers' demands were met, which were also included in the Boletín Oficial del Estado. However, following the strikes, a large number of miners were fired or deported from Asturias.

== Consequences and repercussion ==
=== Repression ===
The regime responded by repressing the mining families that participated in the strike, in addition to the "silent" and bloody repression of the forces of order at the time, such as the Civil Guard. During the strike, approximately 400 workers were detained and many of them tortured. In addition, many workers were forced to leave their homes to go to work by force. Other workers were prosecuted and deported.

=== Consequences in Spain ===
At the national level, the mining strike served as a trigger for other general strikes throughout Spain, which came to mobilize more than 300,000 workers throughout the territory. In a large part of these mobilizations, the explicit reason was to show solidarity with the Asturian miners. The strike once again put Asturias in the international spotlight, something that had not happened since the revolutionary strike of 1934.

Along with the sympathy strikes throughout the Spanish territory, the miners' strike served as a trigger for the opposition to Francoism to meet in June 1962 in what the Francoist regime termed as the Contubernio de Múnich (Munich conspiracy). In addition, a group of intellectuals, headed by Ramón Menéndez Pidal, signed a manifesto demanding freedom of information and the recognition of the right to strike. Likewise, a group of women, including some notable writers, demonstrated with students in Madrid and Barcelona in support of the strikers. For the writer Jorge Martínez Reverte, "the Spanish political transition" began during the strike.

=== International impact ===
French and Welsh trade unions sent representatives to Asturias to investigate the reality of the conditions of the strike. Moreover, news of women being confined in the Oviedo Cathedral reached other countries such as France or Belgium, where sympathy strikes were organized.

In addition, the strike contributed to highlighting the totalitarian quality of the Franco regime, which made it difficult for the regime to integrate into the European Economic Community.

=== In culture ===
Jaime Gil de Biedma's poem "Asturias, 1962" is a tribute to the miners, in which the speaker compares different types of silence: destructive silences which inhibit communication, like that after the Civil War, and silences charged with anticipation of political change, like that during the strike.

== See also ==
- Asturias miners' strike of 2012
- Asturias miners' strike of 1934 (that led to the Revolution of 1934)
- Mining Basins (Asturias)
- Anita Sirgo
