= Anita Sirgo =

Spanish activist (1930–2024)

Ana Sirgo Suárez, known as Anita Sirgo, (20 January 1930 – 15 January 2024) was a Spanish communist militant. She played a very active role during the Asturian miners' strike of 1962, contributing in a prominent way to its success.

== Early life ==
Sirgo was born on 20 January 1930 into a family of miners politically committed to communism and without the possibility of accessing education. With the end of the Civil War and the fall of the Second Republic, her father fled to the mountains to join the resistance, while her mother was detained in Arnao prison, a fate that other relatives also suffered. She was then picked up by some of her aunts and uncles, who took her to live in Andrín, Llanes. There she worked in the fields and also collaborated as a liaison for the guerrillas from the age of nine. At the age of twelve, she was discovered and arrested by the Civil Guard along with other family members, including her mother and her uncle, Fidel Suárez Campurru. The Civil Guard also took away the furniture of the house, which years later appeared to be used in the headquarters of the Falange. She had the opportunity to see her father for the last time, before he was murdered in 1947 and buried in a ditch that has not yet been located. On 26 January 1948, her uncle died along with other guerrillas.

In 1950 she married Alfonso Braña Castaño, a miner in the Fondón mine. Both began to be more active in the Communist Party of Spain.

== 1962 Strike ==
About a month after the beginning of the 1962 miners' strike, a failure began to loom, with miners proposing to return to work. Given the situation, the women of the mining basin decided to organize and actively support the strike in the face of the situation of misery in which they found themselves. Thus, they organized pickets and prevented the scabs from accessing the wells.

In addition, Siro participated decisively in the organization of clandestine women's groups during the strike, with the collaboration of women such as Tina Pérez and Celestina Marrón.These groups were responsible, among other things, for collecting aid in the form of food, transmitting messages or distributing leaflets.

Sirgo participated in the occupation in the cathedral of Oviedo during the 1962 strike along with about forty other women. Under the principle of active non-violence, they tried to give visibility to the struggle throughout the Spanish territory and came to have the support of the auxiliary bishop of the time, Segundo García de la Sierra. They ended the lockdown after solidarity strikes were organised in countries such as France and Belgium, bringing their work to an end.
