= Arnold Taraborrelli =

American choreographer (1931–2024)

- Born: August 31, 1931
- Died: January 7, 2024 (aged 92)

Arnold Taraborrelli (31 August 1931 – 7 January 2024) was an American choreographer. He was born on 31 August 1931 in Philadelphia. In 1995, Taraborrelli received the silver medal of fine arts from the Community of Madrid. He died on 7 January 2024, at the age of 92.
