= Santiago López Valdivielso =

Spanish politician and businessman (1950–2024)

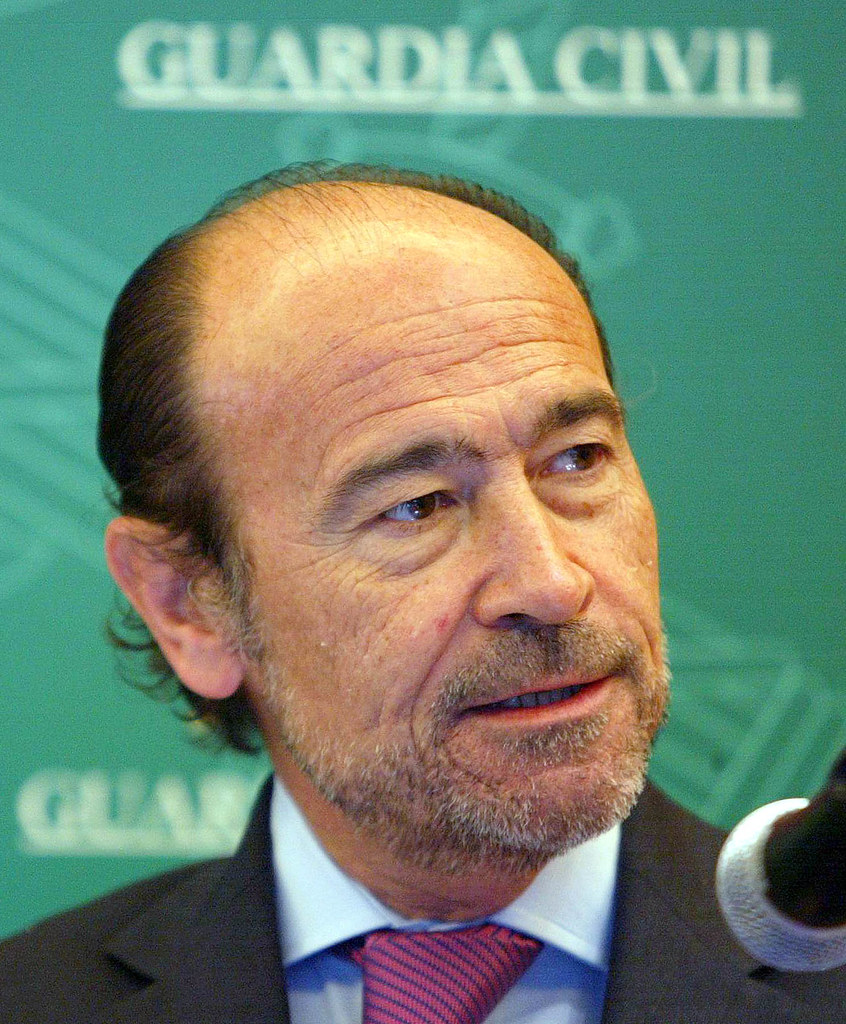
Valdivielso in 2022

Santiago López Valdivielso (7 February 1950, Valladolid – 9 January 2024) was a Spanish politician and businessman. He was the director-general of the Civil Guard from 1996 to 2004 and a deputy from 1986 to 1996. López died on 9 January 2024, at the age of 73.
