= Gitano Jiménez =

Spanish boxer (1952–2024)

Personal information
- Full name: José Antonio Jiménez Jiménez
- Nationality: Spanish
- Born: 11 November 1952; Oviedo, Spain
- Died: 19 January 2024 (aged 71); Oviedo, Spain

Sport
- Sport: Boxing

José Antonio Jiménez Jiménez (11 November 1952 – 19 January 2024), better known as Gitano Jiménez, was a Spanish boxer of the featherweight category.

== Professional boxing career ==
In a 60-fight professional career, he won 41 (14 by knockout), lost 12 (5 by knockout) and had 7 draws (ties). Among others, he faced Tommy Glencross, whom he beat by a 15-round unanimous decision on Saturday, 12 May 1973 to win the EBU featherweight title which was vacant prior to this contest, Svein Erik Paulsen José Bisbal (father of international singer David Bisbal, an eight-round decision win for Jiménez on Saturday, 6 December 1975) and hard-hitting, two-division world champion and International Boxing Hall of Fame member Éder Jofre, to whom Jimenez lost by a ten-round unanimous decision on Friday, 2 July 1976 at São Paulo, Brazil.

== Personal life ==
He was born in Pumarín, Oviedo on 11 November 1952, and died in Oviedo on 19 January 2024, at the age of 71.

=== Titles ===
- European featherweight champion (1973-1975)
- Spanish featherweight champion (1972)
- Spanish junior lightweight champion (1971)
