= 2012 Asturian miners' strike =

Industrial dispute in Spain

- Part of 2011–2012 Spanish protests
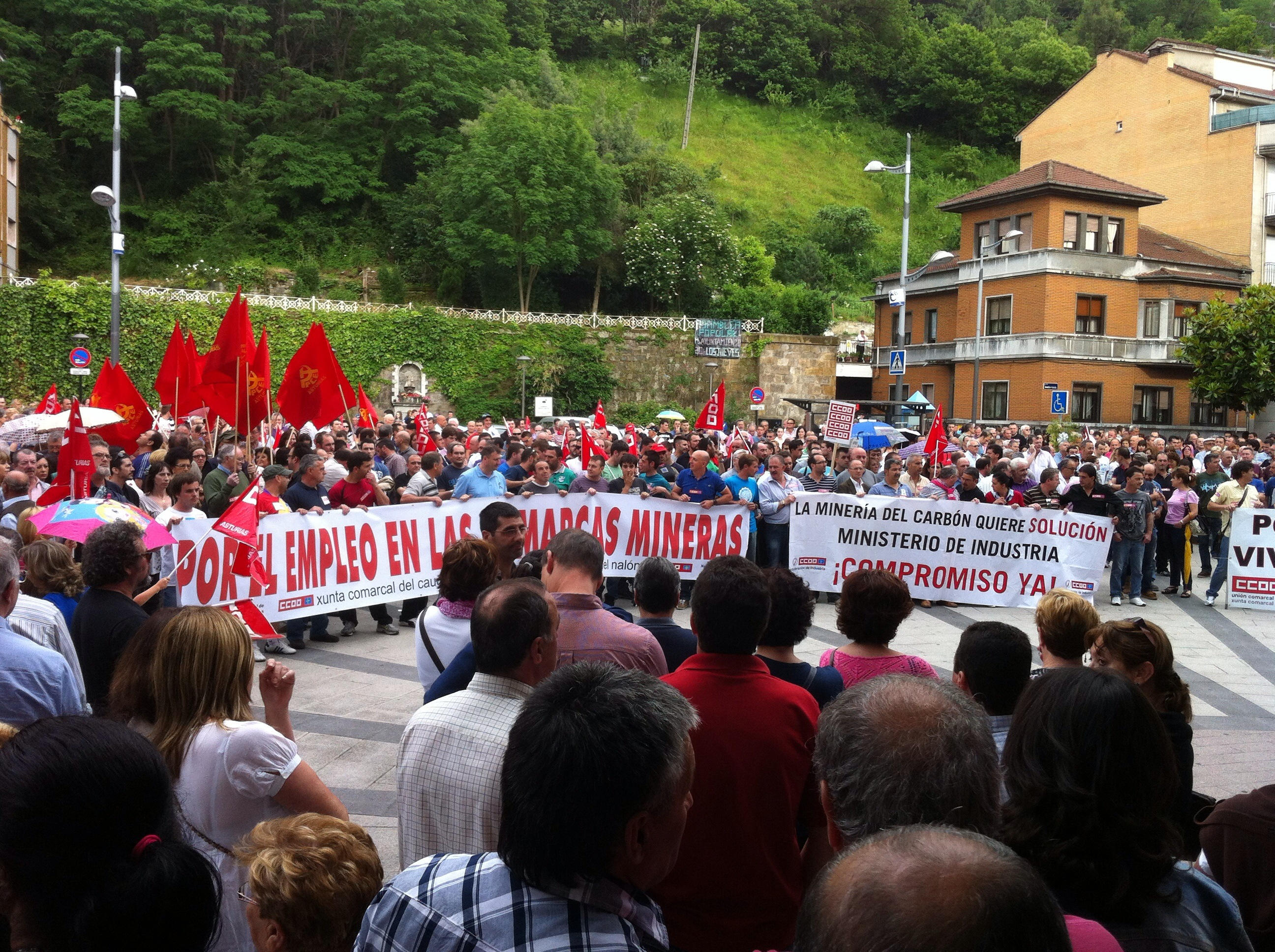
- Demonstration in support of the strike in Mieres, Asturias in June 2012
- Date: 29 May – 3 August 2012
- Location: Asturias, Spain
- Caused by: Opposition to the cutting of subsidies for coal mining
- Methods: Strike action, attacks on police, road blockades, marches
- Result: See § Return to work

Casualties
- Injuries: At least 88

The 2012 Asturian miners' strike was an industrial dispute involving more than 8,000 coal miners in the Spanish autonomous community of Asturias. The geographer David Featherstone has described the strike as "one of the most dramatic forms of anti-austerity protest to emerge in the wake of the 2008 financial crisis."

== Background ==
Location of Asturias within Spain

The coal mining industry has played a part in the local economy of the provinces of Asturias and León since the Roman era. The region also has a history of militancy: an uprising in 1934 led by miners took place but was crushed by General Franco; and a miners' strike which began in Asturias in 1962 involved nearly 500,000 workers and was the first time under Franco that a workers' movement had won significant concessions from the state. Miners also engaged in protests against privatization and industrial restructuring in the 1980s and 1990s. In 2010 the miners were successful in another dispute, which resulted in legislation supporting the coal industry. The Spanish coal industry had been in decline since the 1990s as subsidies were phased out, however, resulting in a significant reduction in the number employed by the industry. Between 1990 and 2015 coal extraction in Spain dropped by 76.5 percent and the number of workers employed in the industry declined by 85.7 percent.

In order to comply with European Union regulations requiring Spain to reduce its fiscal deficit, and aiming to end state aid for the electric power industry by 2018, in 2012 the Spanish government announced plans to reduce subsidies for 40 mines from €300 million to €110 million. The subsidies were designed to bolster Spain's energy sector as well as to support programs that would transfer miners to jobs in green infrastructure development. The Unión General de Trabajadores, Spain's largest trade union said such a reduction would lead "to the shutdown of coal mining and the abandonment of the mining districts to their fate." Miners wanted the subsidies to continue until 2018, and argued that Spain's limited energy resources meant it must keep the mines open in order to protect itself against future shocks in the energy market.

== Dispute ==
Miners began their strike in late May 2012. The strike included attacks on police and offices of the ruling People's Party. Miners attacked police with rockets, stones, nuts and bolts, and blocked up to 60 roads a day including 16 main roads and motorways and two railway lines. Miners also occupied a mineshaft and erected barricades made from burning tires. The Civil Guard and riot police used tear gas, baton charges and rubber bullets. In June 2012, a rail passenger was injured when the train on which he was traveling collided with tree trunks placed on the tracks.

On 15 June, clashes were reported by the Ministry of the Interior to have resulted in seven injuries, two of them serious, comprising four police officers and three journalists. The Interior Ministry said the injuries took place when police tried to remove roadblocks of burning tires and came under attack from missiles fired by miners. On 5 July, a child aged five and a woman were injured by stray missiles during violence between miners using home-made rocket launchers and police using rubber bullets, while miners using rockets caused burns to two policemen on 6 July.

Richard Maxwell and Toby Miller have argued that the miners' tactics were rooted in their knowledge of the area's geography: "The battle lines they drew in this conflict were deeply rooted in knowledge of the roads, valleys, rivers and mountains where the miners took positions to outwit and out-gun, when they could, the better armed paramilitary"

The strike overlapped with a transport workers' strike in Asturias and León. A general strike was held on 18 June in Asturias, León, Galicia and Aragon.

=== March to Madrid and demonstration ===
In June, a group of miners embarked on a march to Madrid. Around 240 miners were involved the 20-day journey, which converged in the capital on 10 July. As the miners neared the Puerta del Sol, the arrival of supporters swelled their numbers to thousands for a night protest lit by the lights on their hard hats.

On 11 July, miners and trade unionists were met by thousands of supporters, and marched again through the center of Madrid, towards the Ministry of Industry. In addition to the miners who had marched, thousands more traveled on buses from Asturias, León, Aragon and Puertollano. The demonstration saw police charges, rubber bullets, and demonstrators throwing fireworks, bottles and stones at police. 76 people were injured and six protesters were hospitalized. Prime Minister Mariano Rajoy spent the morning announcing further austerity measures.

=== Response ===
The government of Asturias condemned the violence but called on the national government to revise its plans to cut subsidies. A spokesperson for the regional government said president Javier Fernández Fernández had requested a meeting with industry minister José Manuel Soria. The local branch of the Workers' Commissions denounced the violence, which it said was "the exception and should not be repeated". However the Communist Party of Spain declared its support for the actions.

In June 2012, 10,000 miners' supporters marched in Madrid, resulting in clashes with police. Miners in Wales have also offered their support to the Spanish strikers. At a solidarity march for men trapped in mines in León, also in June 2012, marchers wore T-shirts reading "S.O.S. Mining in danger of extinction." Supporters also established a protest camp in Oviedo, the capital of Asturias.

Also in June 2012, a letter by the Spanish Miners' Solidarity Committee appeared in The Guardian, which complained of "an almost total blackout of news about the response of the workers' movement in Spain to the austerity measures being pursued by the government" and compared the Asturian miners' strike and the authorities' response to the UK miners' strike of 1984–85, concluding that "British miners ... owe an enormous debt of gratitude to the Spanish trade unions and particularly the miners for their solidarity and financial support during 1984–85. It is now time to stand with them." The Spanish Miners' Solidarity Committee also organized and raised funds in support of the strike in the UK, and arranged for a delegation of miners to speak at the Durham Miners' Gala.

The footballer David Villa, who grew up in Asturias, also called for solidarity with the miners.

=== Return to work ===
The unions told their members to return to work on 3 August 2012, with no compromise having been reached, but said they would soon announce further industrial action.

== Significance ==
Maxwell and Miller have argued that "The miners’ strike was not merely a local flair up [sic] of militant action", but rather "expressed a trans-territorial, multi-generational struggle against European government policies that threaten workers' rights, autonomy and well being." They argue that the strike exemplified a problem identified by the cultural theorist Raymond Williams, characterized by the need to respond to environmental despoliation and the social effects of such a response. They conclude that "As the Spanish miners understood, the greening of industrial political economies is a strife-ridden, transformational moment that calls on worker participation to move livelihoods and cultural norms toward a society of sustainability."

Amaranta Herrero and Louis Lemkow have identified the framing of the strike as an anti-austerity struggle, the representation of the cutting of subsidies as an outcome of globalization, and the omission of discussion of technological changes in mining, the history of subsidies and the environmental problems caused by coal mining from the debate as factors in the consolidation of widespread support for the miners. They also identify a social imaginary around the idealized figure of the miner as a contributing factor. They argue that the debate "was reduced to the social sphere, only a matter of worker solidarity and of opposition to liberalization measures", with the effect that "The necessity of urgently reducing CO_{2} emissions, and therefore of starting to put an end to perverse subsidies worldwide, was omitted from public debate."

== See also ==
- 2008–2014 Spanish financial crisis
- Anti-austerity movement in Spain
- List of protests in the 21st century
