= Tourism in the Canary Islands =

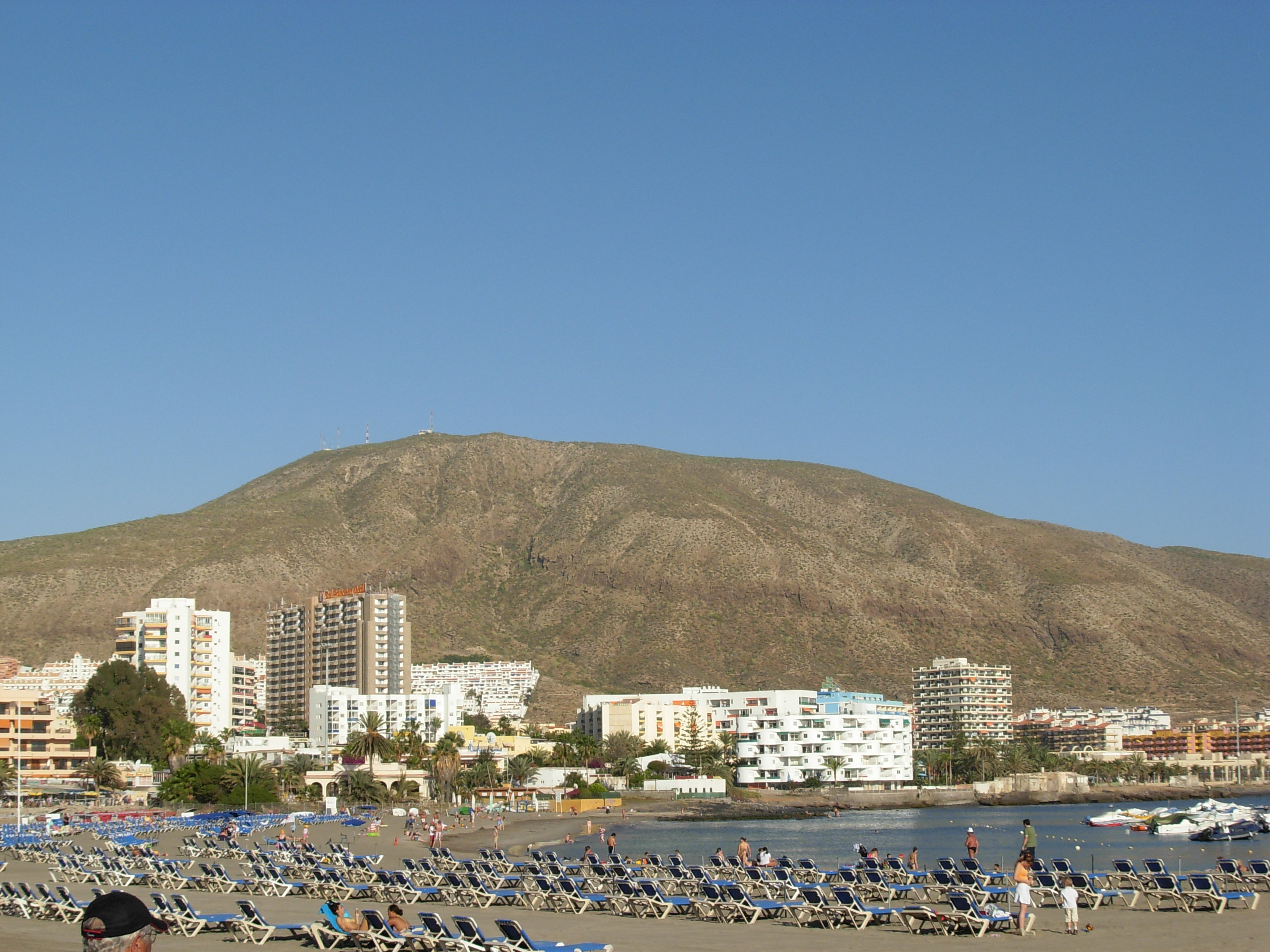
Los Cristianos, Tenerife

Tourism is an essential part of the economy of the Canary Islands, a Spanish archipelago located in the Atlantic Ocean, 100 kilometres (62 miles) west of Morocco. Seven main islands and six islets make up the Canary Islands. They had 16 million visitors in 2023. Tourists seeking sunshine and beaches first began to visit the Canaries in large numbers in the 1960s. The Canary Islands are a leading European tourist destination with very attractive natural and cultural resources.

== Nationalities ==
By nationalities that visit the Canary Islands, the destinations preferred by the British are Tenerife and Lanzarote, capturing 46.7% and 25% of their arrivals respectively; the Germans are distributed in a balanced way between Fuerteventura (29.8%), Gran Canaria (28.9%) and Tenerife (26.1%); Nordic people mostly choose Gran Canaria (58.7%) and Spaniards Tenerife (46%).

The Canary Islands continue to receive tourists from traditional markets and is experiencing the emergence of visitors from other countries such as Italy, France and Poland. For Italian tourists, Tenerife is the main destination (42.49%), followed by Fuerteventura (22.21%), Gran Canaria (18.78%) and Lanzarote (16.51%). The French choose Tenerife in first place with 35.0%, followed by Fuerteventura (30.9%), Lanzarote (20.1%), Gran Canaria (13.3%) and La Palma (0.7%). Polish tourists are divided between; Tenerife (38.8%), Fuerteventura (26.7%), Gran Canaria (21.9%), Lanzarote (11.9%) and La Palma (0.7%).

In absolute numbers, Tenerife lead the ranking of tourists, with 5,928,000 and Gran Canaria with 4,478,000.

== Statistics ==
Tourism in the Canary Islands (Note: Data prior to 2005 counts international arrivals only.)
Year	Arrivals
2024	17,767,834
2023	16,210,910
2022	14,617,382
2021	6,697,166
2020	4,631,805
2019	15,115,708
2018	15,560,969
2017	15,975,509
2016	14,981,113
2015	13,301,252
2014	12,924,435
2013	12,187,822
2012	11,767,792
2011	12,000,324
2010	10,432,047
2009	10,216,424
2008	11,799,381
2007	12,114,927
2006	11,964,853
2005	11,312,531
2004	9,593,785
2003	9,972,237
2002	10,047,189
2001	10,208,945
2000	10,022,821
1999	9,836,323
1998	9,681,757
1997	8,677,930
1994	7,569,096
1993	6,545,396
1990	4,872,849
1985	3,735,735
1980	2,522,619
1975	2,011,000
1970	821,000
1965	316,500
1960	69,000
Country	Population (2008 total)
Germany	2,498,847
Great Britain	3,355,942

Number of tourists who visited the Canary Islands in 2016, per destination island (in thousands):

- Tenerife – 4,885.9
- Gran Canaria – 3,654.8
- Lanzarote – 2,328.7
- Fuerteventura – 1,914.1
- La Palma – 221.5
- La Gomera and El Hierro – 109.3

== Tourist attractions ==
The Canary Islands have 257 kilometres of beaches. Despite the relatively small area of the seven main islands (7,447 km^{2}), they have very diverse landscapes, including long sandy beaches, spectacular cliffs, deserts, and woods. Pico del Teide is the highest mountain in Spain, with a height of 3,718 m, is located on Tenerife. They have four national parks, seven biosphere reserves (Gran Canaria, Lanzarote, Fuerteventura, La Gomera, El Hierro, La Palma and Macizo de Anaga in Tenerife), and more than 140 other protected areas. Visitors in the national parks are not permitted to leave defined paths or to camp in the parks.

Tenerife is the largest and most populous island of the Canary Islands. The island of Tenerife receives about 5 million tourists each year, making it the most popular island for tourists. Tourist attractions here include nightlife, walking, and whale-and bird-watching. Loro Parque (meaning "Parrot Park") on Tenerife has a collection of 3,000 parrots. However, most of these parrots cannot be seen by visitors. There is another facility south of the main park where approximately 330 parrots species are kept and a breeding program takes place. Other attractions in the park include alligators, gorillas, chimpanzees, jaguars, penguins, porpoises, Killer Whales, sharks, and tigers. San Cristóbal de La Laguna is a World Heritage Site. Tenerife also has the highest elevation of Spain, a World Heritage Site that is the third largest volcano in the world from its base, El Teide. Teide is the most visited national park in Spain, with a total of 2.8 million visitors, according to the Instituto Canario de Estadística (ISTAC), and it is one of the most visited National Parks in the world.

Gran Canaria has the biggest city in the Canary Islands, Las Palmas. Gran Canaria receives approximately 4 million tourists every year. Maspalomas is one of the most famous tourist attractions. This island is considered to have the best weather in the Canary Islands and some of the best beaches of Europe (Playa del Ingles, Playa de Las Canteras, etc.). Gran Canaria has near 50% of its territory declared an UNESCO Biosphere Reserve. This island is usually called "a continent in miniature" because of the diversity of its landscapes.

Lanzarote, the most northeasterly of the Canary Islands, has been designated a UNESCO Biosphere Reserve. It has an arid volcanic landscape and there are about 300 volcanic cones on the island. The island has a low-key approach to tourism and the traditional architecture of island's interior are taken into consideration. This approach was influenced by the artist César Manrique, who was from Lanzarote. Manrique created works in Lanzarote and the other islands, including Jardin de Cactus, an amphitheatre-shaped garden with ten thousand cacti and stone sculptures. A 26-foot-high (7.9 m) cactus sculpted from metal by Manrique is located by the entrance to the garden.

In late 2009 the Canary Islands Tourist Board launched a marketing campaign called "Operation No Winter Blues". 100 Canarian residents aged between 18 and 35 were selected to be ambassadors for the Islands. The campaign is based on the original name of the Fortunate Islands, with the ambassadors sharing the islands' good fortune with selected countries. The campaign involves the 100 citizens traveling to 14 European destinations spreading positive news about the Canaries and lasted until mid December.

The Canary Islands are an excellent place for astronomical observation. The trade winds blowing from the North leave the South of the high-relief islands clear and windless. These islands also benefit from low light pollution. For these reasons, four of the seven main islands have been recognized as a Starlight Destination by the UNESCO.

== Overtourism ==
Overtourism occurs when a destination receives too many visitors – a subjective quantity that will vary according to each destination – impacting local people's quality of life, clogging essential services, and increasing house prices beyond the reach of residents. Overtourism can also negatively impact wildlife and the wider environment.

In 2023, the Canary Islands welcomed a record-breaking 16 million visitors, leading campaigners to warn that islands' ecosystems face collapse if numbers are not curbed. The 2023 report from Ben Magec-Ecologists in Action states "Uncontrolled, increase in the non-resident population of European origin, giving rise to completely overcrowded islands in which the generation of waste and the exploitation of resources cause an almost irreversible degradation of our natural ecosystems."

In December 2023, local residents mounted protests against tourism, driven by anger over an increase in housing prices, traffic congestion, and sewage spills due to the increased number of visitors.

In March 2023, Lanzarote's tourism authorities announced that the island was a "tourist-saturated area" and that it would be focusing on attracting tourists that spend more money rather than increasing tourism numbers.

== See also ==
- Geology of the Canary Islands#Geotourism
- Marine life of the Canary Islands
- Geography of the Canary Islands
