= Andreas Deja =

German-American animator (born 1957)

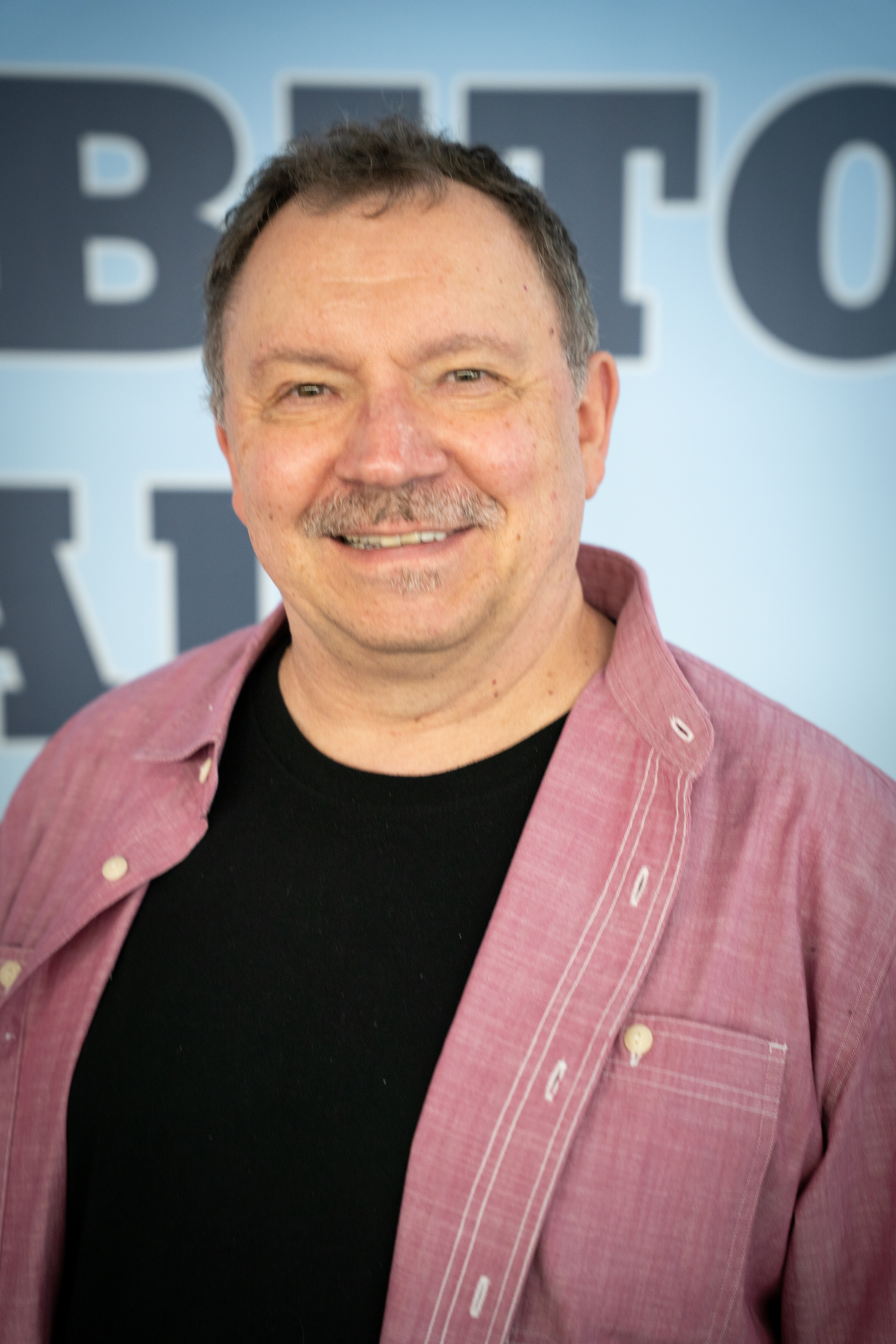
- Andreas Deja at Lipscomb University for Animation Y'all 2026
- Born: 1 April 1957 (age 69); Gdańsk, Polish People's Republic
- Occupation: Animator
- Years active: 1980–present
- Employer: Walt Disney Animation Studios (1980–2011)
- Awards: Winsor McCay Award, 2006; Disney Legends, 2015

Andreas Deja (Note: German pronunciation: [[Anˈdʁeːas Deja]]) (born 1 April 1957) is a Polish-born German-American character animator most noted for his work at Walt Disney Animation Studios. Deja's work includes serving as supervising animator on characters in several Disney animated films, including King Triton and Vanessa in The Little Mermaid, Gaston in Beauty and the Beast, Jafar in Aladdin, and Scar in The Lion King, the titular character in Hercules, Lilo Pelekai in Lilo & Stitch, Mama Odie and Juju in The Princess and the Frog, and Tigger in Winnie the Pooh.

== Early life ==
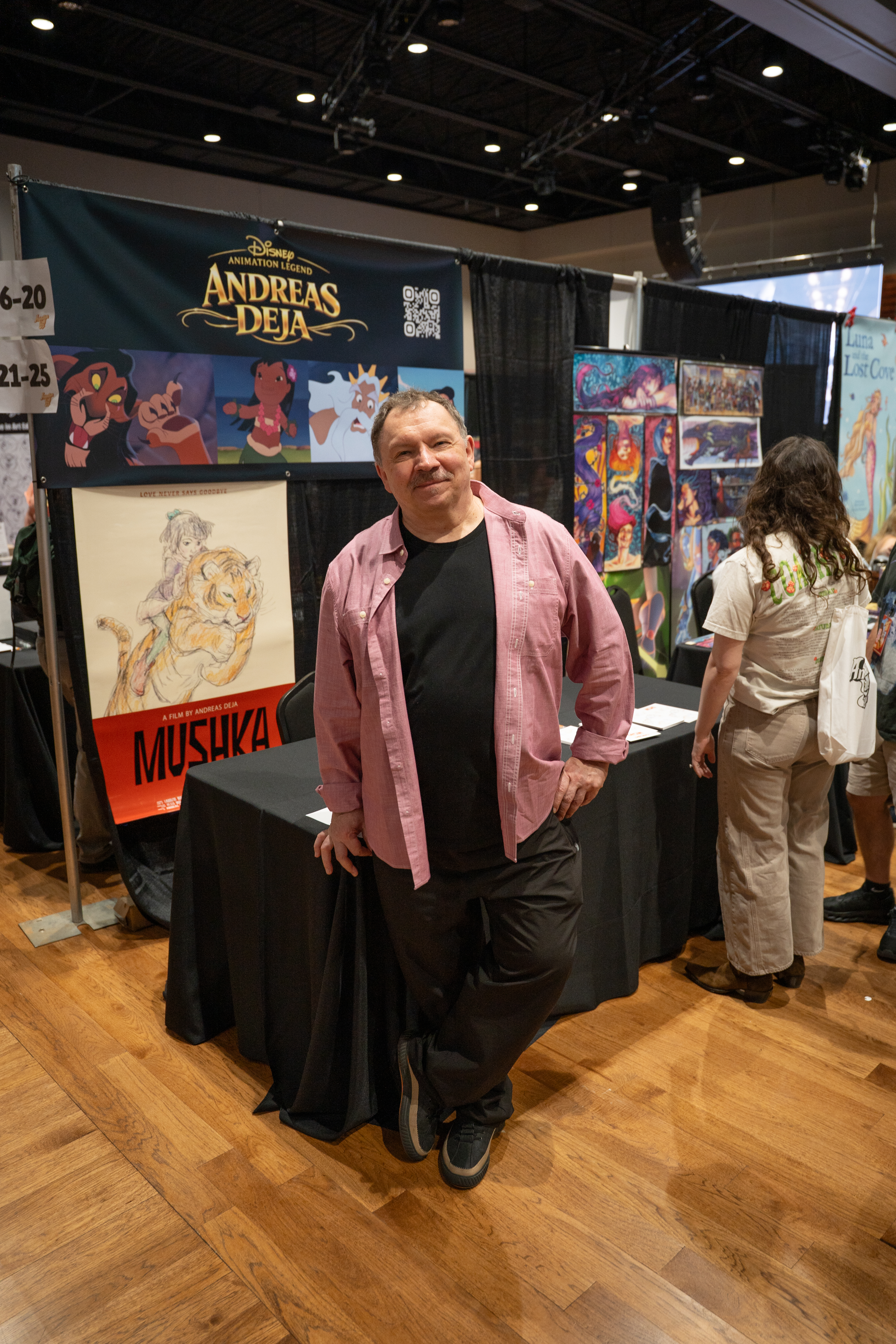
Andreas Deja at Lipscomb University for Animation Y'all 2026

Andreas Deja was born on April 1, 1957, in Gdańsk, Poland, and in 1958, moved with his family to Dinslaken, Germany, near Duisburg, where he began honing his drawing skills as a teenager. He credits seeing Disney's The Jungle Book as an 11-year-old with inspiring him to become an animator. At that young age, he promptly wrote to Walt Disney Productions to express his interest in working there, and received back a form letter which he has kept ever since. Deja later summarized the letter and how he acted on it as follows: "Please, do not send us any copies of Mickey Mouse. We can teach you that. You need to become an artist in your own right first. Watch the world around you. Draw your brothers and sisters. Go to the zoo. Sketch the animals a lot ... I took it very seriously ... I knew I had to be good. I knew I had to be above average." Following the advice from Disney's letter, he regularly visited the Duisburg Zoo to study animal anatomy and movement, experiences that would later influence his animation of characters such as Scar in The Lion King.

After graduating from Theodor-Heuss Gymnasium (secondary school) in Dinslaken, where he was taught by the artist and art teacher Alfred Grimm, he studied graphic design at the Folkwang Hochschule in Essen, Germany.

== Career ==
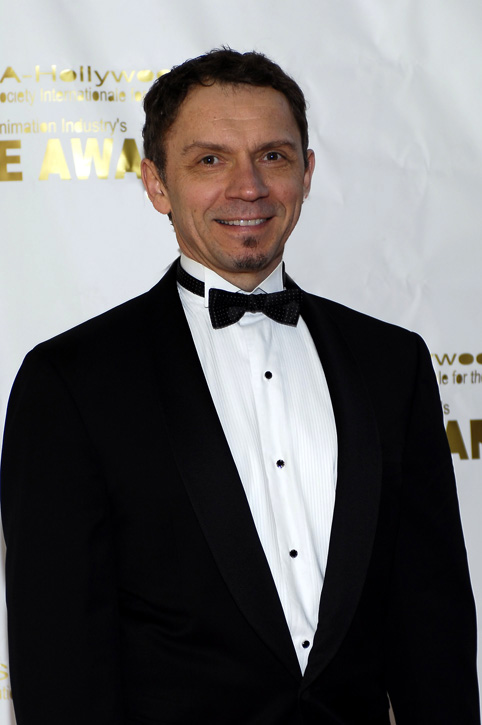
Deja at the 35th Annie Awards in 2006

A lifelong fan of Disney animated films, Deja was hired by the studio in August 1980 after he had corresponded with Eric Larson, one of Disney's senior Nine Old Men of animation who ran the studio's training department. The first film on which he worked for was The Black Cauldron, during which time he shared a cubicle with future film director Tim Burton.

During his rookie days at Disney, Deja sought mentorship and practical advice from seven of the then-living Nine Old Men, who were already retired before his tenure. Deja has collected information on the Nine Old Men over the years, and has stated that one of his ambitions is to publish one book for each of the Nine Old Men.

Deja is best known as the supervising animator of some of the most memorable Disney villains: Gaston in Beauty and the Beast, Jafar in Aladdin, Scar in The Lion King and Queen Narissa in Enchanted. He also animated Roger Rabbit in Who Framed Roger Rabbit, King Triton in The Little Mermaid, the title character in Hercules, Lilo Pelekai in Lilo & Stitch, Mama Odie in The Princess and the Frog and Tigger in Winnie the Pooh. In addition, he is the current resident specialist for the animation of Mickey Mouse.

In 2011, he began a blog where he shares some of his collection of the work of the early Disney animators.

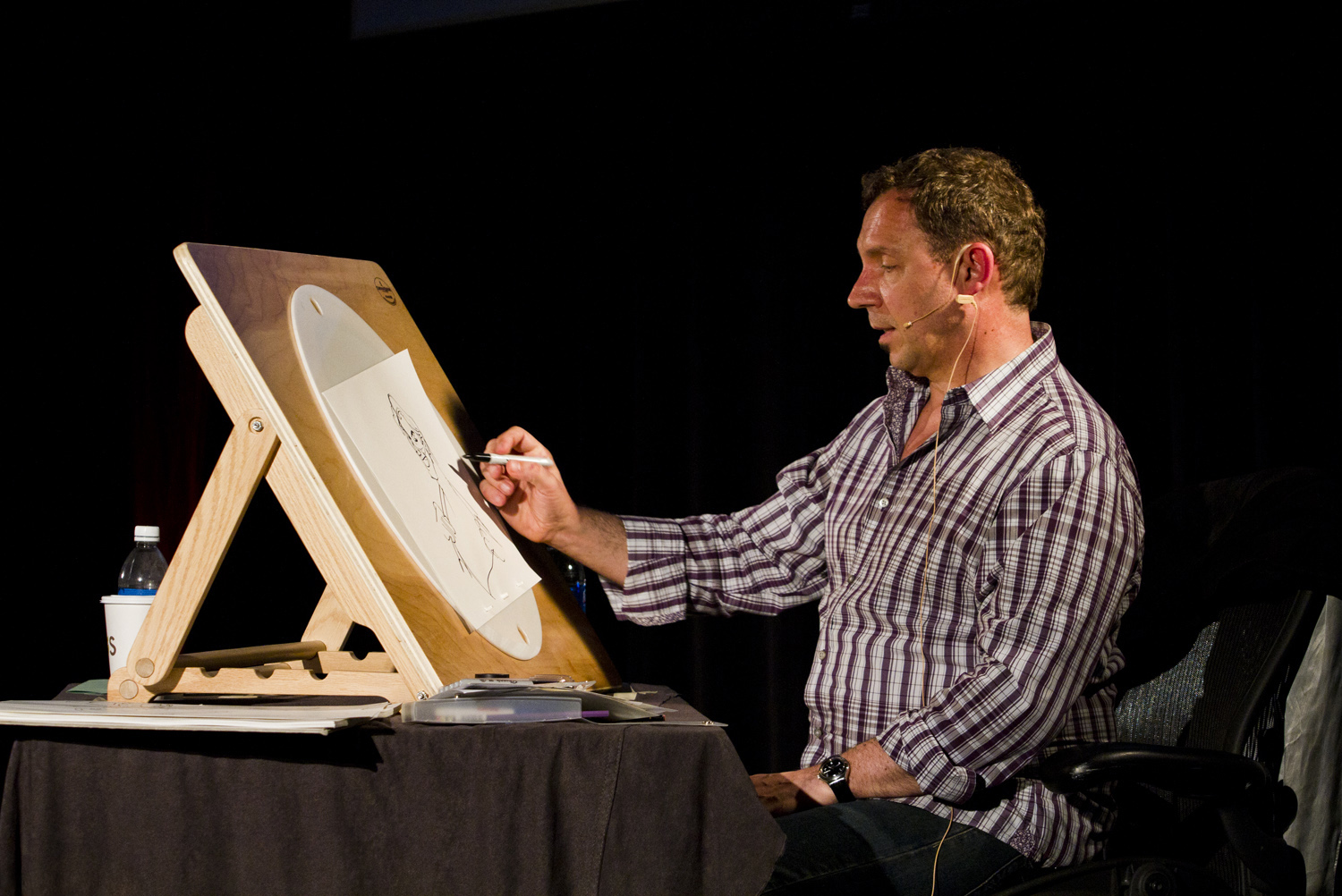
Deja in 2012 at a masterclass workshop at the Studio Technique in Montreal

In 2015, Deja authored The Nine Old Men: Lessons, Techniques, and Inspiration from Disney's Great Animators ISBN 978-0415843355 published by Focal Press.

As of June 2023, he currently worked on the animated short film Mushka.

Deja was the guest curator for the exhibition titled Walt Disney's The Jungle Book: Making a Masterpiece which took place at The Walt Disney Family Museum from June 23, 2022, to January 8, 2023, to celebrate the film's 55th anniversary. A Members Only Preview of the exhibition which included a special talk with Deja, Darleen Carr, Floyd Norman and Bruce Reitherman took place on June 22, 2022. Deja also wrote an extensive companion book for the exhibition which was originally slated to be published by Weldon Owen on September 20, 2022, before it was changed to November 1, 2022.

== Personal life ==
Deja is openly gay. His sexuality has been discussed as an influence on the development of some Disney characters.

== Filmography ==
Year	Title	Credits	Characters	Notes
1985	The Black Cauldron	Animator / Character Designer	Taran, Eilonwy, Dallben, Gurgi, Doli, Horned King, Fairfolk And Talyllyn	
1986	The Great Mouse Detective	Character Animator	Queen Mousetoria	
1988	Who Framed Roger Rabbit	Supervising Animator	Roger Rabbit, Weasels, Baby Herman, Gorilla, Hyacinth Hippo, Clarabelle Cow, Mickey Mouse, Minnie Mouse, Bugs Bunny, Daffy Duck, Donald Duck, Goofy, Droopy, Pinocchio, Speedy Gonzalez and Porky Pig	
1988	Oliver & Company	Character Designer		
1989	The Little Mermaid	Directing Animator / Supervising Animator / Character Designer	King Triton and Vanessa	
1990	The Prince and the Pauper (Short)	Supervising Animator	Mickey Mouse & The Prince	
1991	Beauty and the Beast	Supervising Animator	Gaston	
1992	Aladdin	Supervising Animator	Jafar	
1993	Jungledyret Hugo	Character Designer		
1994	The Lion King	Supervising Animator	Scar	
1995	Runaway Brain (Short)	Supervising Animator	Mickey Mouse, Julius as Mickey	
1997	Hercules	Supervising Animator	Adult Hercules	
2000	Fantasia 2000	Animator – Segment "Rhapsody in Blue" / Character Animator – Host Sequences	Mickey Mouse	
2000	The Emperor's New Groove	Additional Visual Development Artist		
2002	Lilo & Stitch	Supervising Animator	Lilo Pelekai	
2004	Home on the Range	Animator	Alameda Slim and Junior the Buffalo	
2004	Mickey's Twice Upon a Christmas (Video)	Animation Consultant		
2006	Bambi II (Video)	Animation Consultant		
2007	Enchanted	Animator	Queen Narissa	
2007	How to Hook Up Your Home Theater (Short)	Animator	Goofy	
2009	The Princess and the Frog	Supervising Animator	Mama Odie and Juju	
2011	The Ballad of Nessie (Short)	Animator	Nessie	
2011	Winnie the Pooh	Supervising Animator / Visual Development Artist	Tigger	
2017	Loving Vincent	Animator		
2019	Klaus	Character Designer		
2020	Prop Culture	Himself	Episode: "Who Framed Roger Rabbit"	
2021	Even Mice Belong in Heaven	Character Designer		
2023	Mushka	Director		

== Awards ==
In 2006, at the 34th Annie Awards, Deja was awarded the Winsor McCay Award for outstanding contribution to the art of animation. At the 2015 D23 Expo, he was honored as a Disney Legend.
