= Gurgi =

Character from The Chronicles of Prydain

- The Chronicles of Prydain character
- First appearance: The Book of Three
- Last appearance: The High King
- Created by: Lloyd Alexander
- Voiced by: John Byner

Gurgi is a fictional character in The Chronicles of Prydain, the series of fantasy novels by Lloyd Alexander. Gurgi is the hero Taran's faithful companion, appearing in all five books.

== Profile ==
He is described as being a cross between man and beast, having long arms, covered with fur and leaves, and ever hungry but really "just a sort of a, kind of a thing". His demeanor is extremely loyal and caring, almost to a fault. His manner of speech is filled with rhymed pairs of words ("crunchings and munchings", "smackings and whackings", "sneakings and peekings", etc.), and redundant phrases ("see with lookings!"); he refers to himself in the third person. Gurgi is humble and loyal toward his human companions, at first submitting even to Taran as a "noble lord".

== Appearances ==
Gurgi is one of the few characters to appear in all five books of the series, the others being Taran, Fflewddur, Dallben and Coll.

In The Book of Three, Taran first meets Gurgi in his quest to locate Hen-Wen, the oracular pig. At first, Taran is disdainful of Gurgi, believing him to be more of a nuisance than anything else. By the end of the book, he learns the value of true companionship.

In The Black Cauldron, Gurgi, along with Princess Eilonwy, sneakily follows the Companions to the Black Gate of Annuvin. Gurgi would accompany the Companions to the Marshes of Morva and eventually be the one to find the Black Cauldron.

In The Castle of Llyr, Gurgi accompanies Taran in escorting the Princess Eilonwy to the Isle of Mona and faces all sorts of dangers when she is kidnapped by a foe long thought dead.

In Taran Wanderer, Gurgi loyally follows Taran on what might be the most important quest of his life, the search for his true identity (who his parents were, etc.), and proves to be a true friend.

In The High King, Gurgi's bravery is proven from beginning to end and when all is said and done, he must make the hardest choice of all.

== Origins ==
According to a 1999 publisher's note, quoting Alexander on The Chronicles, "'The people in it were born, like most children, at unlikely and inconvenient times.. Gurgi, for example, appeared in the predawn hours. ... Suddenly there he was, with his groanings and moanings, looking like a disordered owl's nest."

According to Alexander, nearly all of the proper names in Prydain are from Welsh myth or history, perhaps all except Eilonwy and Taran. There are several characters named Gurgi in Welsh legend, the most important of whom was Peredur's brother.

== Adaptations ==
=== Disney version ===
Gurgi
- First appearance: The Black Cauldron (film) (1985)
- Voiced by: John Byner

In Disney's animated version of The Black Cauldron, Gurgi is portrayed as a small anthropomorphic dog-like creature, voiced by actor/impressionist John Byner.

The fast-food restaurant Gurgi's Munchies and Crunchies operated in Walt Disney World's Magic Kingdom from October 1986 to February 1993. Gurgi's eatery remains the rare Black Cauldron tie-in for a Disney theme park, with the sole other example at Tokyo Disneyland, where the Horned King appeared in the Cinderella Castle Mystery Tour from July 1986 to April 2006.

The Disney version of Gurgi also appears in the world-building video game Disney Magic Kingdoms as a playable character to unlock for a limited time.

== Additional information ==
- The cover on one edition of The Black Cauldron shows Gurgi looking like a raggedy humanoid with bushy hair and thin limbs, almost like a starving vagrant. Another has him illustrated similar to a Chimpanzee.
- Gurgi possesses a magical wallet, a gift from Prince Gwydion, which provides an indefinite supply of nourishing, though somewhat tasteless and dry food.
- While his mount has no name per se, he is often seen riding a shaggy pony.

== Sources ==
- Patterson, Nancy-Lou (1976). "Homo Monstrosus: Lloyd Alexander's Gurgi and Other Shadow Figures of Fantastic Literature". Mythlore: A Journal of J.R.R. Tolkien, C.S. Lewis, Charles Williams, and Mythopoeic Literature. 3 (11). Southwestern Oklahoma State University. ISSN 0146-9339.
- Patterson, Nancy-Lou; Urrutia, Benjamin (1986). "Reviews". Mythlore: A Journal of J.R.R. Tolkien, C.S. Lewis, Charles Williams, and Mythopoeic Literature. 4. 12 (46). Southwestern Oklahoma State University. ISSN 0146-9339.
- Tunnell, Michael O. (2003). "Gurgi". The Prydain Companion: A Reference Guide to Lloyd Alexander's Prydain Chronicles. Henry Holt and Company. ISBN 978-1627792349 – via Google Books.
