= Taran Wanderer =

1967 fantasy novel by Lloyd Alexander

- First edition cover
- Author: Lloyd Alexander
- Cover artist: Evaline Ness
- Language: English
- Series: The Chronicles of Prydain
- Genre: Fantasy
- Published: August 24, 1967 (Holt, Rinehart and Winston)
- Publication place: United States
- Media type: Print (hardcover & paperback)
- Pages: 222 (first edition)
- ISBN: 0-8050-1113-7 (first edition, hard)
- OCLC: 244128642
- LC Class: PZ7.A3774 Tar
- Preceded by: The Castle of Llyr
- Followed by: The High King

Taran Wanderer (1967) is an American high fantasy novel by Lloyd Alexander. It follows The Castle of Llyr and precedes The High King in the series The Chronicles of Prydain, which takes place in a setting inspired by Welsh myth. In the course of the story, Taran goes on a quest to understand who he is and what it means to be a man. He is aided by familiar friends such as Gurgi, Dallben, and others. Taran's hope to have noble lineage stems from his desire to marry the absent Eilonwy.

Alexander's experience in Wales during the Second World War informed much of the book, particularly its setting. Initially, Alexander had not intended to write this volume, going straight from The Castle of Llyr to The High King, but his publisher convinced him to do so in order to more satisfyingly depict Taran's arc. The book has attracted attention as a coming of age story that is conversant with Campbell's model of the monomyth. It has also gained a reputation as an example of American mythopoetic literature, both as a single book and as a part of the larger Chronicles. Many reviewers, particularly near its release, considered Taran Wanderer an excellent example of literature for maturing young adults.

== Background ==
Lloyd Alexander attributed the setting and arc of The Chronicles of Prydain to lifelong fascinations with Arthurian legend and mythology more generally. More specifically, Alexander cited his experience during World War Two as an American intelligence officer in Wales as an inspiration. In Taran Wanderer, and the other Chronicles, many of the characters exhibit archetypal qualities. For example, the enchantresses Orddu, Orwen, and Orgoch were consciously written with the concept of the Triple Goddess in mind. Taran himself, particularly in Taran Wanderer, seems to be a model of American coming of age heroes in the world of Welsh myth. Notably, Taran Wanderer was not initially planned, as Lloyd Alexander's outline went straight from The Castle of Llyr to The High King. Alexander's publisher convinced him that Taran's arc would make more sense if there was another book focused on his maturation.

== Plot ==
Taran has a crisis of identity because he desires to marry Princess Eilonwy but feels that he cannot unless he is of noble heritage. With Dallben's permission, he and Gurgi depart for the Marshes of Morva to ask Orddu, Orwen, and Orgoch for insight on Taran's parentage. As Taran has not brought payment for this information, the three redirect him to the Mirror of Llunet, far to the east.

To prepare for this new goal, Taran and Gurgi seek aid in Cantrev Cadiffor, the realm of King Smoit. They become embroiled in a feud between Lords Gast and Goryon, vassals of Smoit who bicker constantly, largely about the possession of the magical cow Cornillo. The war between Gast and Goryon destroys the fields of farmers Aeddan and Alarca, who are left destitute. Taran mediates the dispute between Gast and Goryon, and awards Cornillo to Aeddan and Alarca. Smoit offers to adopt Taran, but Taran declines and feels that he must journey further to find himself. Fflewddur Fflam joins Taran and Gurgi as they leave the cantrev.

On the journey, the group is first joined by Kaw, whose pranks result in Gurgi finding a splinter of bone hidden in a tree. Then they encounter Doli, a friend and ally from previous adventures. He has been turned into a frog by the sorcerer Morda, who has been harassing the Fair Folk even in their places of refuge. Not long after, Morda captures Taran and his friends, and begins transforming them into animals. When he tries to transform Taran, he discovers that Taran possesses the bone splinter, Morda's own finger-bone that he transferred his lifeforce into. During their struggle, Morda inadvertently breaks the bone. This kills the wizard and restores the company to their natural shape.

Taran's group is next fed and sheltered by Dorath, a bandit and mercenary. Dorath's hospitality is motivated by greed, as he assumes that Taran is seeking treasure. When his offer to join forces with Taran is rebuffed, Dorath pressures him into a fight over Taran's sword. The bandit cheats and wins, leaving Taran weaponless.

Next encountered on the road is Craddoc, a widower and shepherd. He claims Taran as his son; Fflewddur, thinking the quest fulfilled, then leaves the group. Taran and Gurgi stay with Craddoc. Taran both hates and admires the shepherd, as Craddoc is a good man who has also shattered his ambition of marrying Princess Eilonwy. During the winter, Craddoc is fatally wounded. Taran and Gurgi attempt to help him, but cannot. As he dies, Craddoc admits that he has deceived Taran, as he is childless and desired a son. Taran manages to summon the Fair Folk to save Gurgi and himself, but they are unable to aid Craddoc, who is dead.

Taran and Gurgi bury Craddoc, and then resume the journey to the Mirror of Llunet. They arrive at the unique homestead of Llonio, who lives by luck; to Llonio, any circumstance is one of good fortune. Llonio dubs Taran "Wanderer," and bids him luck on his quest. Eventually, Taran and Gurgi arrive at the Free Commots, a set of prosperous communities without lords. Taran apprentices first with Hevydd the Smith, then with Dwyvach the Weaver, and finally with Annlaw Clay-Shaper. With each master Taran crafts an object—a sword, a cloak, and a bowl. All offer to let Taran stay with them—the first two as an apprentice, the last as a friend. He politely declines all three offers. Soon after, one of the Commots is attacked by Dorath and his band. Taran leads the defense, routing the bandits. In gratitude, Annlaw tells him the location and nature of the Mirror of Llunet: a pool of water a short journey away from the Free Commots.

When Taran and Gurgi arrive at the Mirror, Taran looks briefly into the water and then yells in shock. Immediately, they encounter Dorath, who is seeking vengeance. Dorath defiles the pool and then attacks Taran, but Dorath's sword, earlier stolen from Taran, breaks, and Dorath flees. Taran and Gurgi return to Annlaw's home. When Annlaw asks what Taran has learned, Taran replies that he now understands himself from viewing his reflection and reviews the lessons that he has learned on the journey—his parentage matters less than the life he has made and his life is what he makes of it. The next morning, Taran and Gurgi begin the journey back to Caer Dallben.

== Reception ==
Generally, the novel has received good reviews, particularly when it was published. Upon release, Taran Wanderer was hailed as "a wise and noble book" by Phyllis Cohen of the Young Reader's Review. Jean Fritz, writing for the New York Times Book Review, said that "Lloyd Alexander's triumph is that while his plots follow a slashing heroic pattern, his quest is into the subtleties of manhood itself. It is rare that high excitement yields such quiet wisdom." Receiving it somewhat less enthusiastically, Kirkus Reviews said of the book, "If you've done well with the others, you'll want this. If not, try Tolkien." More academically, Lois Rostow Kuznets described Wanderer as more targeted towards adolescents than the rest of the "prestigious" series.

Taran Wanderer, and the Prydain series in general, has been considered an early example of post-Tolkien American mythopoetic fantasy. For example, Marek Oziewicz argues that a reverence for tradition and American values of hard work intertwine with ancient and medieval Welsh myth and folktale. Oziewicz particularly highlights the glorification of everyday folk and craftsmanship in Taran Wanderer as straddling the barrier between American and Welsh legend. Brian Attebery sees Taran's arc in Taran Wanderer as a mirror to Huckleberry Finn, as well as other American heroes who wander looking for identity and home.

Notably, Taran Wanderer has also attracted attention as a psychologically complex text about maturation and individuation. Liam Butchart, a psychiatrist and literary critic, argued in 2019 that Alexander fused Jungian archetypes and Campbell's monomyth into a universal coming-of-age tale. Further, he argues that the novel "seems to be at the center of a nexus of different approaches and goals" and serves an example of the broad potential in young adult fantasy literature as a catalyst for identity formation. Butchart revisited the theme later in The Scandinavian Psychoanalytic Review, arguing that Taran's arcs with Dorath, Craddoc, and the Free Commots mirrors Freudian ideas of reconciling conflicts from the family romance and unresolved Oedipal conflicts.
