= Virginia Haviland =

American author and librarian

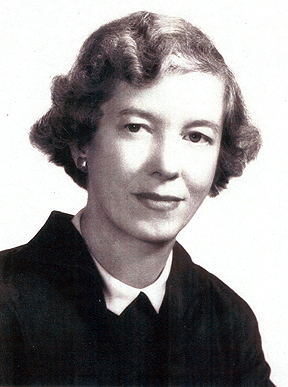
- Virginia Haviland ca 1935
- Born: 21 May 1911; Rochester, New York, US
- Died: 6 January 1988 (aged 76); Washington, D.C., US
- Occupations: Author, Editor, Librarian
- Employer: Library of Congress
- Known for: Edited "Favorite Fairy Tales Around the World" series; Founded Children's Book Section at Library of Congress
- Relatives: Co-founders of Haviland China (cousins); Willis Haviland Carrier (cousin); Willis Bradley Haviland (cousin)

Virginia Haviland (May 21, 1911 – January 6, 1988) was an American librarian and writer who became an international authority in children's literature. She chaired the prestigious Newbery-Caldecott Award Committee, traveled and wrote extensively. Haviland is also well known for her Favorite Fairy Tales series, featuring stories from sixteen countries.

== Life and career ==
Virginia Haviland was born in Rochester, New York, to William J. Haviland and Bertha M. Esten. She grew up mainly in Massachusetts. During her childhood, she traveled abroad and spent time with two aunts who entertained international visitors in their home. The early influence of contact with international visitors may have influenced her adult interest in traveling and working with international colleagues.

Haviland held a BA in economics and mathematics from Cornell University (1933). She became a children's librarian in 1934 for the Boston Public Library, under the tutelage of Alice Jordan, founder of children's services there. She was a branch librarian and children's librarian at Boston from 1948 to 1952, and a reader's adviser for children from 1952 to 1963. Haviland studied folklore under Albert B. Lord at Harvard.

In 1949 Haviland gave the New England Library Association's Hewins Lecture for research in the history of children's literature about nineteenth-century travel books for children, and taught Library Service to Children and Reading Guidance for Children at Simmons University School of Library Science from 1957 to 1962. She also reviewed for The Horn Book Magazine for about thirty years.

Haviland chaired the Children's Services Division of the American Library Association (ALA) from 1954 to 1955, and as such attended conferences of the International Board on Books for Children (now called the International Board on Books for Young People), the International Federation of Library Associations, and the Institutions Roundtable for Children's Literature Documentation Centers.

She was also chair of the Newbery-Caldecott Award Committee of the ALA from 1953 to 1954, and held positions of authority in other national and international professional organizations, including positions on many committees and juries that selected outstanding children's books. Her "credo was 'The right book for the right child at the right time.' She had high standards by which to judge children's literature and also accepted newer forms."

Haviland judged the New York Herald Tribune Children's Spring Book Festival Awards from 1955 to 1957, as well as the International Hans Christian Andersen Award, the Book World Children's Spring Book Festival Awards, and the National Book Awards (1969). She was instrumental in beginning the Washington Post Children's Book Guild Nonfiction Award.

In 1962 Haviland was invited to found the Center for Children's Literature at the Library of Congress in Washington DC. She became its first Head in 1963, and worked for the Library of Congress until her retirement in 1981.

In a note to Haviland's cousin, author C. S. Haviland, fellow Regina Medal-winning author Jane Yolen wrote:

She was funny, acerbic, brilliant, and did not suffer fools at all. She was also gracious, never condescending, and saw her calling (as a librarian) as one of the highest callings of all. Her knowledge of American and British children's literature—and folklore in particular—was encyclopedic. It's been years since she died, but I still think of her.

Virginia Haviland died of a stroke on January 6, 1988, in Washington, D.C. Her commitment to literature for young people continues to be recognized by the Virginia Haviland Scholarship for students in the Master of Arts in Children's Literature programs in the Ifill College at Simmons University.

== Awards and legacy ==
Haviland was awarded the Regina Medal "for continuous distinguished contribution to children's literature" from the Catholic Library Association in 1976, and the Grolier Award for "unusual contributions to the stimulation and guidance of reading by children and young people" by the ALA that same year.

She was awarded American Library Association Honorary Membership 1982 "for her many accomplishments on behalf of children and for those professionals who work with children in the United States and throughout the world ... the Association joins her colleagues who have bestowed upon her the rank of Ambassador for Children's Books."

Her "interest and participation in the international arena was ahead of her time and gave the United States an established place in international children's library and literature organizations. She left a worthy legacy for children's literature at the Library of Congress at the culmination of her career."

== Works, fairy tale series ==
In the 1950s, Virginia Haviland was a pioneer in attempting to collect international fairy tales into a series of volumes that were more accessible to children. While still a Boston librarian, Haviland submitted a proposal for her Favorite Fairy Tales series to Little, Brown and Company, who accepted and published her books in hard cover ca 1959–71. The books were republished in trade paperback by Beech Tree in the mid-1990s. To compile her series, Virginia Haviland traveled around the world meeting with librarians, authors, and authorities in fairy tales. The collection includes:

Title	Year	Source	Original illustrator	New edition illustrator
Favorite Fairy Tales Told in France	1959	Retold from Charles Perrault and other French storytellers	Roger Duvoisin	Victor Ambrus
Favorite Fairy Tales Told in England	1961	Retold from Joseph Jacobs	Bettina Ehrlich	
Favorite Fairy Tales Told in Russia	1961	Retold from Russian storytellers	Herbert Danska	
Favorite Fairy Tales Told in India	1973		Blair Lent	Vera Rosenberry
Favorite Fairy Tales Told in Germany	1959	Brothers Grimm	Susanne Suba	
Favorite Fairy Tales Told in Sweden	1966		Ronni Solbert	
Favorite Fairy Tales Told in Poland	1963		Felix Hoffmann	
Favorite Fairy Tales Told in Spain	1963		Barbara Cooney	
Favorite Fairy Tales Told in Ireland	1961		Artur Marokvia	
Favorite Fairy Tales Told in Czechoslovakia	1966		Trina Schart Hyman	
Favorite Fairy Tales Told in Scotland	1963		Adrienne Adams	
Favorite Fairy Tales Told in Denmark	1971		Margot Zemach	
Favorite Fairy Tales Told in Japan	1967		George Suyeoka	
Favorite Fairy Tales Told in Greece	1970		Nonny Hogrogian	
Favorite Fairy Tales Told in Italy	1965		Evaline Ness	
Favorite Fairy Tales Told in Norway	1961	Retold from Norse folklore	Leonard Weisgard	

In 1985, Little, Brown and Company also published a single-volume sampling of her series called Favorite Fairy Tales Told Around the World.

From the 1994 Beechtree paperback reprint: "In recent decades, folk tales and fairy tales from all corners of the earth have been made available in a variety of handsome collections and in lavishly illustrated picture books. But in the 1950s, such a rich selection was not yet available. The classic fairy and folk tales were most often found in cumbersome books with small print and few illustrations. Helen Jones, then children's book editor at Little, Brown and Company, accepted a proposal from a Boston librarian for an ambitious series with a simple goal—to put an international selection of stories into the hands of children. The tales would be published in slim volumes, with wide margins and ample leading, and illustrated by a cast of contemporary artists. The result was a unique series of books intended for children to read by themselves—the Favorite Fairy Tales series. Available only in hardcover for many years, the books have now been reissued in paperbacks that feature new illustrations and covers. | The series embraces the stories of sixteen different countries: Czechoslovakia, Denmark, England, India, France, Italy, Ireland, Germany, Greece, Japan, Scotland, Norway, Poland, Sweden, Spain and Russia. Some of these stories may seem violent or fantastical to our modern sensibilities, yet they often reflect the deepest yearnings and imaginings of the human mind and heart. Virginia Haviland traveled abroad frequently and was able to draw upon librarians, storytellers, and writers in countries as far away as Japan to help her make her selections. But she was also an avid researcher with a keen interest in rare books, and most of the stories she included in the series were found through a diligent search of old collections. Ms. Haviland was associated with the Boston Public Library for nearly thirty years—as a children's and branch librarian, and eventually as Readers Advisor to Children. She reviewed for The Horn Book Magazine for almost thirty years and in 1963 was named Head of the Children's Book Section of the Library of Congress. Ms. Haviland remained with the Library of Congress for nearly twenty years, and wrote and lectured about children's literature throughout her career. She died in 1988."

Haviland also organized The Fairy Tale Treasury (1972) and The Mother Goose Treasury (1966), both illustrated by Raymond Briggs and published by Hamish Hamilton. The Mother Goose Treasury won the Kate Greenaway Medal in 1966.

== Other works ==
- Haviland, Virginia (ed). The Fairy Tale Treasury. Illustrated by Raymond Briggs. London: Hamish Hamilton, c1972.
- Andersen, Hans Christian. The Complete Fairy Tales and Stories. Translated by Eric Christian Haugaard. Foreword by Virginia Haviland. New York: Doubleday & Co., c1974.
- Haviland, Virginia (ed). The Openhearted Audience: Ten Authors Talk about Writing for Children. Washington DC: Library of Congress, c1980. (Featuring: Introduction by Virginia Haviland; "Only Connect" by P. L. Travers; "Questions to an Artist Who Is Also an Author" (an interview of Maurice Sendak by Virginia Haviland); "Between Family and Fantasy: An Author's Perspectives on Children's Books" by Joan Aiken; "Portrait of a Poet: Hans Christian Andersen and His Fairy Tales" by Erik Christian Haugaard; "Sources and Responses" by Ivan Southall; "The Child and the Shadow" by Ursula K. Le Guin; "Illusion and Reality" by Virginia Hamilton; "Under Two Hats" by John Rowe Townsend; "Into Something Rich and Strange: Of Dreams, Art, and the Unconscious" by Eleanor Cameron; and "The Lords of Time" by Jill Paton Walsh.)
- Haviland, Virginia and Margaret N. Coughlan. Yankee Doodle's Literary Sampler of Prose, Poetry & Pictures: Being an Anthology of Diverse Works Published for the Edification and/or Entertainment of Young Readers in America Before 1900. New York: Thomas Y. Crowell, c1974.
- Haviland, Virginia (ed). North American Legends. New York: Putnam Pub Group Juv, c1981. / (Faber Book of...) London: Faber & Faber, c1979.
- Haviland, Virginia (ed). Children & Poetry: A Selective Annotated Bibliography. Washington DC: Library of Congress, c1969.
- Haviland, Virginia. William Penn: Founder and Friend. New York: Abingdon-Cokesbury Press, c1952.
- Haviland, Virginia. Children and Literature Views and Reviews. Scott, Foresman, c1973.
- Haviland, Virginia. The Stone of Victory and Other Tales of Padraic Colum. New York: McGraw Hill, c1966.
- Bechtel, Louise Seaman. Books in Search of Children – Speeches and Essays by Louise Seaman Bechtel. Edited by Virginia Haviland. New York: MacMillan, c1969 / London: Hamish Hamilton, c1970.
- Elleman, Barbara and Virginia Haviland. Children's Books of International Interest. Chicago: American Library Association, c1972.
- Haviland, Virginia. Children's Literature – A Guide to Reference Sources. Washington DC: Library of Congress, c1966.
- Haviland, Virginia. Ruth Sawyer, a Walck Monograph. New York: Henry Z. Walck, c1965.
- Field, Carolyn W., Virginia Haviland, Elizabeth Nesbitt. Subject Collections in Children's Literature. American Library Association. Committee on National Planning for Special Collections of Children's Books. New York: R.R. Bowker and Co., c1969.
- Haviland, Virginia and Margaret N. Coughland. Samuel Langhorne Clemens, a Centennial for Tom Sawyer, an Annotated Selected Bibliography. Washington DC: Library of Congress, c1976.
- Haviland, Virginia (ed). The Best Children's Books: 1964–1978 With 1979 Addenda. Illustrated by Debbie Dieneman. New York: University Press Books, c1981.
- Blishen, Edward and Nancy. A Treasury of Stories For Five Year Olds. Illustrated by Polly Noakes. (Includes "The Cat and the Parrot" by Virginia Haviland.) New York: Kingfisher, c1989.

== Memberships ==
- International Board on Books for Children (member of executive board)
- International Federation of Library Associations (member of executive committee)
- P.E.N.
- Authors Guild
- Authors League of America (the parent of the Author's Guild)
- American Library Association (chairman of Children's Library Association, 1954–55 Chairman of Book Evaluation Committee, 1962–63)
- National Council of Administrative Women in Education
- International Society of Woman Geographers
- District of Columbia Library Association
- Washington Children's Book Guild
- Pi Lambda Theta

== Bibliography ==
- Cole, Dorothy Ethylin (ed.). Who's Who in Library Service.
- Ward, Martha E. (1990). Authors of Books for Young People. Scarecrow Press. ISBN 978-0810822931.
- Cullinan, Bernice E.; Person, Diane G., eds. (January 2005). The Continuum Encyclopedia of Children's Literature. A&C Black. ISBN 978-0-8264-1778-7.
- Who Was Who in America, vol. 9
