= The Black Cauldron (novel) =

1965 fantasy novel by Lloyd Alexander

- First edition cover
- Author: Lloyd Alexander
- Cover artist: Evaline Ness
- Language: English
- Series: The Chronicles of Prydain
- Genre: Fantasy
- Published: August 5, 1965 (Holt, Rinehart and Winston)
- Publication place: United States
- Media type: Print (hardcover & paperback)
- Pages: 224
- ISBN: 0-8050-0992-2 (first edition, hard)
- OCLC: 302887
- LC Class: PZ7.A3774 B1
- Preceded by: The Book of Three
- Followed by: The Castle of Llyr

The Black Cauldron (1965) is a high fantasy novel by American writer Lloyd Alexander, the second of five volumes in The Chronicles of Prydain. The story continues the adventures of Taran, the Assistant Pig-Keeper, as he joins in a quest to capture the eponymous Magical Cauldron from Arawn Death-Lord. It was a Newbery Honor book in 1966, runner-up for the year's "most distinguished contribution to American literature for children".

The book provided a title and many plot elements for the 1985 Disney animated feature The Black Cauldron.

== Origins ==
The series was inspired by Welsh mythology and by the castles, scenery, and language of Wales, which the author experienced during World War II combat intelligence training.

At one stage of planning, it was a trilogy with titles The Battle of the Trees, The Lion with the Steady Hand, and Little Gwion.

== Plot ==
More than a year after the defeat of Arawn Death-Lord's army and death of his warlord the Horned King, Prince Gwydion calls allies to a council hosted by Dallben, one of Taran's guardians. Men are disappearing throughout Prydain, while an increasing number of the undead Cauldron-Born have joined Arawn's forces. At the council, Gwydion reveals an elaborate plan to steal the Black Cauldron, the magical artifact used to create the Cauldron-Born, from Arawn. King Morgant will lead the main force in an attack on Arawn's stronghold of Annuvin, while a smaller raiding party led by Gwydion breaks off to enter by a mountain pass known only to Coll that will allow them to steal the cauldron undetected. Three men have been designated to remain behind with pack animals to serve as a rearguard and secure the retreat: Adaon, the warrior son of chief bard Taliesin; Taran; and Ellidyr, Prince of Pen-Llarcau, who is arrogant, wiry, strong, and threadbare. Ellidyr disdains Taran for his place on the farm and his unknown parentage. Taran envies Ellidyr for his noble birth, despite Dallben's counsel that that youngest son of a minor king has only "his name and his sword". Both are dismayed to share a role with no chance for glory.

In spite of the growing feud between Taran and Ellidyr, all goes smoothly until Gwydion's raiders find that the cauldron has disappeared. The company rejoins the rearguard in haste to escape the newly-deployed Huntsmen of Annuvin. Meanwhile, the uninvited Princess Eilonwy and man/beast Gurgi have caught up with the quest from behind. Gwydion and Coll are split off from the party but, thanks to Doli of the Fair Folk, all others find refuge underground in a Fair Folk waypost maintained by Gwystyl. From Gwystyl and his pet crow, Kaw, the companions learn that the cauldron has been stolen by the three witches Orddu, Orwen and Orgoch, who reside in the bleak Marshes of Morva. (Note: According to maps by Evaline Ness, the witches live on the opposite fringe of the Marshes, near the south coast of the southwestern tip of Prydain, far from people and Fair Folk. • Ness prepared one map of Prydain for each of the five novels. The last, best-informed, and largest scale map illustrates book five, The High King (1968), and the expanded edition of The Foundling and Other Tales of Prydain (1999).) When they depart the waypost, Ellidyr rides southward, determined to retrieve the cauldron single-handedly. With the Huntsmen abroad, Adaon leads Taran, Eilonwy, Gurgi, Doli, and the wandering bard Fflewddur Fflam in pursuit of Ellidyr. When they are attacked and scattered, Adaon is mortally wounded and Taran inherits his brooch, whose gift and burden is prophetic dreams and visions. With its guidance, he gathers and leads all but Doli toward the Marshes. From the fringe, Taran guides his small party through the Marshes to temporary safety and leads a pursuing band of Huntsmen to their deaths.

Orddu and her sisters refuse to give up the cauldron unless Taran and his companions offer something of, in their judgment, equivalent value. After the sisters reject the magical artifacts offered by his companions, Taran is compelled to barter Adaon's brooch. The companions then try to destroy the cauldron, but learn from the witches that it can only be destroyed by a living person who knowingly and willingly climbs in to die. Horrified, the companions resolve to take the cauldron to Dallben to seek an alternative solution.

At the ford of the river Tevyn, the heavy and cumbersome cauldron sinks into the riverbed. Ellidyr arrives and offers to help extricate the cauldron if the others will credit him for the whole enterprise. Taran agrees, but Ellidyr reneges on their bargain and rides off with the cauldron alone when they have freed it. The companions then encounter Morgant and his army. In Morgant's camp they see Ellidyr beaten and bound and realize Morgant has betrayed them, seeking to claim the cauldron for his own and generate his own army of Cauldron-Born to conquer Prydain. Morgant offers to spare the companions' lives if Taran will enter his personal service. Doli arrives invisibly and cuts the companions' bonds. Mortally wounded, Ellidyr rushes the cauldron while Taran and the others engage Morgant and forces himself inside, destroying the cauldron. Gwydion, King Smoit, and his army arrive and defeat Morgant in battle. As Taran, Eilonwy, and Gurgi take leave of Gwydion at the verge of Caer Dallben, Gwydion observes that Ellidyr has, in death, found the honor he so dearly sought in life.

== Analysis ==
Writing in Studies in the Literary Imagination, Melody Green analyzes The Black Cauldron through René Girard's description of the trope of scapegoating: in the novel, Ellidyr's death is like a "final scapegoat", argues Girard. The black cauldron, which can reanimate corpses, can only be destroyed from the inside by someone who dies in the process. While normally the scapegoat figure is innocent, Ellidyr is not. Instead, his willingness to be a sacrifice is more important. Ellidyr is made an outsider by his own jealousy and pride when he, Taran, and others are separated from the main army attacking the dark lord. Ellidyr leaves the group while they brave danger to retrieve the black cauldron. When they reunite, he tries to get the group to tell their leader, Gwydion, that he alone retrieved the black cauldron, much to the annoyance of his companions. After they agree to this plan, they are captured by another powerful lord, who wishes to make Taran's group the first reanimated corpses with the cauldron. During the chaos after their prison break, Ellidyr decides to sacrifice himself to destroy the cauldron. Ellidyr's sacrifice transforms his selfishness into selflessness. Taran and Gwydion determine that through losing his life, he gained honor.

== Adaptations ==
The Black Cauldron was loosely adapted by Walt Disney Productions and released in 1985 as an animated feature film. The Black Cauldron film was based primarily on the first two Prydain novels with elements from the others. It was the last Disney film produced before corporate reorganization created Walt Disney Feature Animation (later Walt Disney Animation Studios) as a separate division within the company, and the first to be rated "PG" rather than "G" in the United States by the MPAA. Disney's adaptation of The Black Cauldron was considered a commercial failure because its gross receipts did not match production cost.

Lloyd Alexander's reaction was twofold: "First, I have to say, there is no resemblance between the movie and the book. Having said that, the movie in itself, purely as a movie, I found to be very enjoyable."

The movie inspired a 1986 computer video game with the same title.

== Citations ==
- Alexander, Lloyd (1999). The Black Cauldron. New York: Henry Holt and Company. ISBN 0-8050-6131-2.
- Alexander, Lloyd (1999). The Foundling and Other Tales of Prydain. Enlarged edition. New York: Henry Holt and Company. ISBN 0-8050-6130-4.
- Tuck, Donald H. (1974). The Encyclopedia of Science Fiction and Fantasy: a bibliographic survey of the fields of science fiction, fantasy and weird fiction through 1968. Volume 1: Who's Who, A-L. Chicago: Advent:Publishers. ISBN 0-911682-20-1.
- Green, Melody (Fall 2013). "Jesus, Girard, and Twentieth-Century Fantasy for Young Adults". Studies in the Literary Imagination. 46 (2). Georgia State University: 19–33. doi:10.1353/sli.2013.0011. S2CID 159793080.
