= The Castle of Llyr =

1966 fantasy novel by Lloyd Alexander

- First edition cover
- Author: Lloyd Alexander
- Audio read by: James Langton
- Cover artist: Evaline Ness
- Language: English
- Series: The Chronicles of Prydain
- Genre: Fantasy, Children's literature
- Publisher: March 3, 1966 (Holt, Rinehart and Winston)
- Publication place: United States
- Media type: Print (hardcover & paperback)
- Pages: 204 (first edition)
- ISBN: 978-0-8050-1115-9 (first edition, hard)
- OCLC: 22921733
- Preceded by: The Black Cauldron
- Followed by: Taran Wanderer

The Castle of Llyr (1966) is a high fantasy novel by Lloyd Alexander, the third of five volumes in The Chronicles of Prydain. The story continues the adventures of Taran, the "Assistant Pig-Keeper", and his companions.

Princess Eilonwy, the latest enchantress to be born of the House of Llyr, "faces the unavoidable (and in her view absolutely unnecessary) ordeal of becoming a young lady." The young hero Taran accompanies her on her journey to the royal court of the Isle of Mona, the same island where her ancestral home was located, and where she will continue her education as a princess. Soon after her arrival, she is kidnapped by agents of the evil sorceress Achren, who wishes to use her as part of a plan for domination. During the adventure, more is revealed of Eilonwy's heritage and her family's former home, the castle Caer Colur.

== Origins ==
The series was inspired by Welsh mythology and by the castles, scenery, and language of Wales, which the author experienced during World War II army combat intelligence training. Nearly all of the proper names in Prydain are historical or mythological. "Isle of Mona" is a version of Ynys Môn, the Welsh name for the Isle of Anglesey.

Though The Castle of Llyr takes loose inspirations from Welsh folklore, the author noted that the stories are not meant to be retellings. According to Alexander, The Prydain Chronicles communicate "the feeling, not the fact, of the land of Wales and its legends."

== Plot ==
Eighteen months after the destruction of the Black Cauldron, Dallben the enchanter has decided that Eilonwy, as a princess and last of the line of the House of Llyr, needs a proper royal lady's education that he cannot provide. He sends her to reside at Dinas Rhydnant, a royal court on the Isle of Mona, in the west of Prydain. Taran and Gurgi escort her to Mona on a ship belonging to Prince Rhun, a cheerful but incompetent youth. Taran is finally aware of his feelings for Eilonwy, but is saddened that he is a commoner and she a princess and envies Rhun's noble birth.

While Eilonwy is introduced to the tedium of life at court, Taran encounters his old companion Fflewddur Fflam—a minor king who lives as a wandering bard—and a shoemaker who turns out to be Prince Gwydion, traveling incognito. Gwydion tells Taran that Eilonwy is in grave danger, very likely from the evil sorceress Achren, from whom Taran and Eilonwy escaped moments after when they first met one year ago. Taran and Gwydion witness Chief Steward Magg leave the castle at night to signal a ship at sea. The next morning, Magg and Eilonwy do not show for breakfast and it is concluded that Magg has kidnapped the princess. King Rhuddlum organizes search parties, with Prince Rhun in charge of one. The king assigns Taran to the same group and personally asks him to protect his son Rhun during the search, confiding to Taran that he and Queen Teleria hope to betroth their son to Eilonwy. Although resentful and envious, Taran vows to ensure Rhun's safety.

Shortly before dusk, Rhun separates from the group. Taran, Fflewddur, and Gurgi pursue, and the next morning they find Rhun at an abandoned hut in the woods. Inside, they find a small book of blank pages that Rhun keeps for himself, along with a sheaf of notes belonging to the former resident, Glew, a man who experimented with size-enhancement potions. As the companions prepare to leave, they come face to face with Llyan, a mountain cat that Glew made larger than a horse, seemingly intending to eat them. Fflewddur entrances the cat with his harp playing, allowing the companions to escape.

Taran's pet crow Kaw spots Magg and Eilonwy heading for the river Alaw on horseback. Reaching the river, Rhun finds Eilonwy's bauble and tracks indicating Magg and Eilonwy continued their journey by boat. The companions hastily construct a raft to follow downstream, but it disintegrates before reaching the mouth of the river. While repairing the raft, Rhun tumbles into a deep pit and causes a landslide that traps the group. Exploring nearby caverns, the companions eventually find Glew, who is now a giant trapped in the caverns by his enhanced size. The companions promise him Dallben's aid in creating an antidote to his potion, while Glew promises to lead them out of the caverns. Instead, Glew takes the companions to a dead-end and traps them. Glew explains he already knows how to make an antidote that will decrease his size, but he must kill one of the companions for a final ingredient. Glew leaves, promising to free the others if one of them agrees to be a sacrifice for his antidote. Rhun surprises everyone by volunteering to sacrifice himself, believing he is burden to all and incompetent to rule.

Before Glew returns, the companions notice an exit above their heads and convince Rhun to let them help him reach it. As he escapes, Rhun promises to return to the city and bring help. When Glew returns, Taran, Fflewddur, and Gurgi break out and attack him. Rhun does not leave the area but instead doubles back, guided by the light of Eilonwy's bauble. Having grown accustomed to the darkness of the caverns, Glew is overwhelmed by the bauble's light, allowing the companions to escape. Taran discovers that under the light of the bauble, Rhun's book of blank pages is revealed to be filled with writing, though none of them can read the language.

Reaching the mouth of Alaw on the reconstructed raft, the companions reunite with Gwydion, who reveals that he has visited the northeast offshore ruin of Caer Colur, the ancestral home of the House of Llyr, where Eilonwy's grandmother Queen Regat was the last in the line of women to reign. Against Regat's wishes, Eilonwy's mother, Angharad, married the common man Geraint and left Caer Colur, taking a book of the House of Llyr's most powerful enchantments, as well as the Golden Pelydryn necessary to read them. Gwydion tells Taran and the companions that Eilonwy's bauble is, in fact, the long-lost Golden Pelydryn, and that the book of seemingly blank pages found in Glew's house is actually Angharad's book of spells. Gwydion explains that Eilonwy had not been sent to live with Achren to study magic as a child, as Eilonwy had believed; rather, Achren had kidnapped the princess and taken her to Spiral Castle with the intention of harnessing the House of Llyr's magic for her own ends.

Gwydion explains he has seen Achren, Magg, and Eilonwy arrive at Caer Colur with several mercenary guards. Achren hopes to rule Prydain by controlling Eilonwy's mind while also awakening her full ancestral magical power. That night, Gwydion rows their raft to a point of land below the seaward walls that protect the ruins of Caer Colur from the being flooded by the ocean, hiding the book and bauble before they begin their search for the princess. Taran climbs to the tower room where Eilonwy resides, only to find that she does not recognize him or the names of her former companions. She flees from her room and Taran follows, but he is arrested by Magg. Gwydion, Fflewddur, and Gurgi then struggle with Magg and several guards, until Eilonwy and Achren appear, the princess now fully under the witch's control. Achren needs the spell book to master her control of the House of Llyr's magic, and Rhun stupidly reveals that he and the companions know its location. Achren turns to Taran and offers a bargain: she will restore Eilonwy's memories of him and allow them to wed if the young man helps her acquire the book and bauble. Rather than force Taran to decide or be punished for refusing, Gwydion reveals the location of the items.

Eilonwy is given the two heirlooms and begins to examine the book in the light of the bauble. While doing so, she begins to resist Achren's spell. Calling upon the full power of the Pelydryn, she incinerates the book in a column of crimson flame rather than let it be abused. Achren aims her fury at Magg, who responds by opening the gates that protect the castle from the sea. He then escapes on the only ship with his surviving guards. As the castle floods, Taran loses consciousness.

Taran awakes to discover the companions have reached the shallows alive, thanks to the still-enchanted Llyan pulling them up the beach. Eilonwy explains how she was kidnapped by Magg and lost her bauble en route to Caer Colur. Before leaving the sea, she finds a ceremonial horn that has washed ashore, remarking that this artifact is "all that's left of Caer Colur." She gives the horn to Taran as token of her pledge that she will not forget him during her tenure at Dinas Rhydnant. Having no gift of his own to give to her, Taran can pledge only his word in return, but notes that the word of an Assistant Pig-Keeper "shall do very well indeed." Taran then mentions the hope of Prince Rhun's parents that he and Eilonwy will be engaged. Eilonwy scolds him for taking such a hope seriously.

== Reception ==
American Library Association: Notable Children's Book
