= Princess Eilonwy =

- Chronicles of Prydain character
- Eilonwy, from the cover of the 1980 Laurel-Leaf edition of The Black Cauldron, illustrated by Jean Leon Huens
- First appearance: The Book of Three (1964)
- Created by: Lloyd Alexander
- Voiced by: Susan Sheridan
- Family: Angharad (mother); Geraint (presumed father); Regat (maternal grandmother)
- Spouse: Taran

Princess Eilonwy (/aɪˈlɒnwiː/ eye-LON-wee) is a fictional character in Lloyd Alexander's The Chronicles of Prydain. She appears in four of the five novels in the series, as well as Disney's 1985 animated film adaptation The Black Cauldron. Eilonwy is a member of the Royal House of Llyr, and the women in her line are formidable enchantresses, including her mother, Angharad, and grandmother Regat. She has inherited this characteristic, most readily visible in her manipulation of a magical item she calls her "bauble", a small golden sphere that glows with magical light when activated by her willpower. Eilonwy's father, Geraint, was a commoner with whom her mother fell in love.

== Name origin ==
Eilonwy is not a historical Welsh name (unlike many others used in the stories), but it turns up in a tale by Glasynys—published in Cymru Fu, or The Wales that Was (1862–4), and translated from the Welsh by Sir John Rhys in his Celtic Folklore (1901)—belonging to the daughter of a mermaid named Nefyn ferch Nefydd and her human lover Ifan Morgan. A poem by Talhaiarn also bears the name "Eilonwy". It may be based on the literary Welsh (i.e. obsolete) word eilon, meaning "deer, stag", with the fanciful suffix -wy (used in the 1800s to adorn river names) added for euphony (or perhaps in reference to the river Elan in central Wales).

== Description ==
Eilonwy is described having long red-gold hair, bright blue eyes, and a melodic, youthful voice. As a member of the Royal House of Llyr, she wears a pendant depicting a silver crescent moon, the family emblem. Far from being just another stereotypical damsel-in-distress princess who needs the hero to save her, Eilonwy is hot-tempered, stubborn, and resolute. Although having been trained as a sorceress and not a warrior, she is quite capable of using various kinds of weapons, particularly the sword, bow, and spear. Even when unarmed, she will fight until incapacitated.

Eilonwy commonly uses unusual similes and metaphors, such as "If you don't listen to what somebody tells you, it's like putting your fingers in your ears and jumping down a well." She is also sharp, snippy, strong-willed, and sarcastic, but at the same time talkative and often scatterbrained. Eilonwy frequently gets angry with Taran, usually for reasons he does not understand, though in secret she does care for him. While she is more sure about her growing feelings towards him than he is about his for her, she is content to wait until he confesses to her, which he does in the end.

In the first book of the series, she is described as wearing a white robe and a silver crescent-shaped necklace, which is her family symbol. She seemingly prefers going barefoot over wearing shoes (as noted by Dallben in The Castle of Llyr); when she has to wear shoes (like in The Book of Three), they are invariably sandals. Princess Diahan from Lloyd's earlier novel Time Cat: The Remarkable Journeys of Jason and Gareth, who served as a prototype for Eilonwy, was likewise described as wearing a white robe and sandals.

Eilonwy is voiced by Susan Sheridan in the 1985 Disney animated film The Black Cauldron, which is loosely based on The Chronicles of Prydain. She is portrayed with long blonde hair and light blue eyes. Disney's version of the character also appears in the film's video game, as well in the video game Disney Magic Kingdoms as a playable character.

== The Chronicles of Prydain ==
=== The Book of Three ===
Eilonwy is introduced in The Book of Three. The companions are captured and taken to Spiral Castle, the stronghold of Achren, the former queen of all Prydain and mentor to Arawn, who later overthrew Achren and sent her into exile. At first, Eilonwy seems to be only a rather talkative, easily distracted girl, but she rescues Taran and Fflewddur Fflam (the latter by mistake, since Taran thought the only other person in the dungeons would be Gwydion, his companion, and asked Eilonwy to rescue the other person she described to him). She is described as being perhaps one or two years younger than Taran, the protagonist of the series, but Taran's own age is never given so we have no definite idea of how old either of the characters are.

On their way out of the castle, they pass through a maze of underground passages and eventually reach a tomb where Eilonwy retrieves a sword. This sword is Dyrnwyn, a magical sword with a blade that bursts into flame when it is drawn. However, Eilonwy will not allow Taran to examine the sword or draw it from its rune-inscribed scabbard; despite her incomplete magical training, she is knowledgeable enough to recognize that the sword is highly magical and best left to experts.

Following the destruction of Spiral Castle, Eilonwy joins Taran, Fflewddur, and Gurgi on their journey to warn the Sons of Don of an advancing attack (though Taran asked Fflewddur to take her back to her own kinsmen, she refused to the point of threatening to break Fflewddur's harp over his head if he tried). She attempts to halt several Cauldron Born at one point with an enchanted arrow, but it does not work as she intended. When they are captured by the Fair Folk, she convinces the king to give them Hen Wen, provisions, and a guide to Caer Dathyl. Eilonwy also agrees with Taran's decision to rescue an injured young gwythaint. When the group must pass through a valley with the Horned King's war band, Eilonwy rides with Taran and leaps at the Horned King to try to protect him. When Taran wakes up in Caer Dathyl, she tells him what happened and helps him recover.

Throughout the book, Taran presumes Eilonwy to be—apart from her enchanted heritage—an ordinary girl, and she makes no effort to contradict the presumption. At the end of the story, it is revealed to him that she is a princess, and she is invited to make her home in Caer Dallben.

=== Post-Book of Three ===
After the events in The Book of Three, Eilonwy comes to live at Caer Dallben, home of Dallben the enchanter and Taran. She accompanies Taran on many of his later adventures, and her courage and determination never falter. We later discover that she is the last living descendant of Llyr Half-Speech, the Sea King, which is why Achren abducted the girl as a small child. She is the only one capable of reading a tome that requires the light of her bauble, which only Eilonwy can cause to light. Because her magical tutoring under Queen Achren was incomplete, her ability to perform magic is severely hindered, though she retains and displays certain inborn abilities throughout the series.

Physically, Eilonwy is described as blue-eyed, with red-gold hair (though the film The Black Cauldron depicts her as a blonde). She has a good heart, but is very determined to have her own way and quarrels frequently with Taran, although the quarrels do not last long. She is never without her "bauble"—a magical ball that she can make give off light, which sometimes shows things not visible under ordinary lights.

The Castle of Llyr, the third novel in the series, reveals that this is really the Golden Pelydryn, a magical artifact passed through Eilonwy's family from mother to daughter. The events of that book bring Eilonwy back to her ancestral home, Caer Colur, and give her a greater sense of her ancestry. The Disney film depicts the bauble as a semi-sentient object that floats through the air under its own power, but in the books, it is described more like an orb of gold that must be carried.

=== Further novels ===
The fourth book in the series, Taran Wanderer, sheds light on the ultimate fate of Eilonwy's mother, Princess Angharad. Eilonwy herself never appears in this book, though she is referenced at various times. Taran makes this discovery while Eilonwy is being fostered at the foreign court of King Rhuddlum and Queen Teleria, learning to be "a proper princess". Whether he ever shared the information with Eilonwy is uncertain, though it seems likely that he refrained from doing so in an effort to spare her anguish. By this time Taran realizes that he's fallen in love with Eilonwy, but he is reluctant to act on it because, having been raised as a commoner while Eilonwy is a royal princess, Taran feels that he really does not belong in her world. On the other hand, Eilonwy herself seems to have grown rather fond of Taran by this point, even if she will not admit it.

Taran and Eilonwy's feelings for one another are much more evident throughout the 5th and final book of the Prydain Chronicles, The High King. Although these feelings are never spoken of directly until the last few pages of the novel, Taran and Eilonwy's interactions with one another are noticeably different than in the previous books. Taran internally pines for Eilonwy, and fears for her safety in the midst of the escalating war. Eilonwy's change towards Taran is far more subtle, yet no less certain, and is experienced perhaps more gradually over the course of the entire series in contrast with Taran's very abrupt realization of his feelings towards the Princess in the first chapter of book three, The Castle of Llyr. At the end of The High King, Taran becomes High King of Prydain and marries Eilonwy. She must renounce her magical powers to be allowed to stay in Prydain, since all magical folk are leaving for the Summer Country. The series comes to its conclusion as the coronation and marriage of King Taran and Queen Eilonwy are announced to the people.

A sixth book was published in the series, The Foundling and Other Tales of Prydain. Among the stories included therein, readers learn about the circumstances that resulted in Princess Angharad running away from home to marry the commoner Geraint. Although Eilonwy inherited her mother's red-gold hair and magical heritage, her intense blue eyes came from her father.

== Film adaptation ==
Eilonwy is voiced by Susan Sheridan in Disney's 1985 animated film adaptation The Black Cauldron. Internationally, the character was voiced by Miina Tominaga (Japanese), Diana Santos (Spanish), Nathalie Wijers (Dutch), Katja Primel (German), Marisa Leal (Brazilian Portuguese), Carla Garcia (European Portuguese), Loredana Nicosia (Italian), Barbara Tissier and Chantal Mace (French), Amalie Dollerup (Danish), Therese Reutersward and Josefin Ahlqvist (Swedish), Elif Atakan (Turkish), Maja Kwiatkowska (Polish), Lauren Savir (Hebrew), Sarah MacDonald Berge (Norwegian), Hanna Hietala (Finnish), Klára Sedláčková-Oltová (Czech) and Yelyzaveta Mastayeva (Ukrainian).

== Sources ==
- Davis, Amy M. (2007). "On Wooden Boys and Assistant Pig Keepers". Good Girls & Wicked Witches: Women in Disney's Feature Animation. Indiana University Press. ISBN 978-0-861-96673-8 – via Google Books.
- Davis, Amy M. (2014). "Disney Films 1967-1988: The "Middle" Era". Handsome Heroes & Vile Villains: Men in Disney's Feature Animation. Indiana University Press. ISBN 978-0-861-96907-4 – via Google Books.
- Fierce, Rodney M.D. (2015). "Isn't it Romantic? Sacrificing Agency for Romance in The Chronicles of Prydain". Mythlore: A Journal of J.R.R. Tolkien, C.S. Lewis, Charles Williams, and Mythopoeic Literature. 33 (2). Southwestern Oklahoma State University. ISSN 0146-9339.
- Filmer-Davies, Kath (1996). "The Place of the Pig-Keeper". Fantasy Fiction and Welsh Myth: Tales of Belonging. Palgrave Macmillan. ISBN 978-0-333-65029-5 – via Google Books.
- Fimi, Dimitra (2017). "Lloyd Alexander: Building Fantasy Upon Forgery". Celtic Myth in Contemporary Children's Fantasy: Idealization, Identity, Ideology. Palgrave Macmillan. ISBN 978-1137552815 – via Google Books.
- Fisher, Margery (1975). Who's who in Children's Books: A Treasury of the Familiar Characters of Childhood. Holt, Rinehart and Winston. ISBN 978-0030150913.
- Patterson, Nancy-Lou; Urrutia, Benjamin (1986). "A Pig and a Pot in Prydain". Mythlore: A Journal of J.R.R. Tolkien, C.S. Lewis, Charles Williams, and Mythopoeic Literature. 4. 12 (46). Southwestern Oklahoma State University. ISSN 0146-9339.
- Tunnell, Michael O. (1989). "Profile: Eilonwy of the Red-gold Hair". Language Arts. 66 (5): 558. doi:10.58680/la198924908. ISSN 0360-9170.
- Tunnell, Michael O. (2003). "Eilonwy". The Prydain Companion: A Reference Guide to Lloyd Alexander's Prydain Chronicles. Henry Holt and Company. ISBN 978-1627792349 – via Google Books.
- White, Donna R. (1998). "Chronicles of Prydain". A Century of Welsh Myth in Children's Literature. Greenwood Press. ISBN 0-313-30570-6 – via Google Books.
