= Duffy and the Devil =

1973 children's novel by Harve and Margot Zemach

- Front cover with Caldecott Medal seal
- Author: Harve Zemach
- Illustrator: Margot Zemach
- Genre: Children's book
- Publisher: Farrar, Straus and Giroux
- Publication date: 1973
- Publication place: United States
- ISBN: 0-374-31887-5
- OCLC: 724018
- Dewey Decimal: 398.2/09423/7
- LC Class: PZ8.1.Z38 Du3

Duffy and the Devil (1973) is a book written by Margot Zemach and her husband Harvey Fichstrom (as Harve Zemach). In 1974, it was a finalist for the National Book Award, Children's Literature and winner of the Caldecott Medal for illustration.

The U.S. Library of Congress credits "a Cornish tale retold by Harve Zemach" and a British edition was published by Kestrel Books in 1974, which catalogs with the full title Duffy and the Devil: a Cornish tale retold.

Awards
Preceded by The Funny Little Woman	Caldecott Medal recipient 1974	Succeeded by Arrow to the Sun
