= Sam, Bangs & Moonshine =

1966 picture book by Evaline Ness

- Sam, Bangs and Moonshine
- Author: Evaline Ness
- Illustrator: Evaline Ness
- Genre: Children's picture book
- Publisher: Holt, Rinehart and Winston an imprint of Macmillan Publishing Group LLC
- Publication date: 1966
- Publication place: United States
- ISBN: 0-8050-0315-0
- OCLC: 15669964

Sam, Bangs & Moonshine is a 1966 children's picture book written and illustrated by Evaline Ness. Published by Holt, Rinehart and Winston, it won the 1967 Caldecott Medal for its illustrations.

== Plot ==
Samantha, usually called Sam is the daughter of a widowed fisherman. To keep herself busy, she tells tall tales, including her mother being a mermaid and that Bangs, her cat, can talk to her. Sam also claims to have a pet kangaroo. She prefers her fantasies to reality but her father calls her tales "moonshine" and warns Sam that moonshine will one day lead her into great trouble.

Thomas, Sam's best friend and neighbor, eagerly believes every word Sam says. One day, Sam tells the pleading boy of a not-too-distant cove where he can find her mermaid mother. Thomas heads for the cove with Bangs in tow, but they are caught up in a seastorm and lost. When they fail to return, a horrified Sam tearfully asks her father for help. Sam's father rescues Thomas, who is sick with laryngitis over the incident, but Bangs is washed away. That night, Bangs returns home safely, and Sam finally understands the importance of telling people about things that are real, as opposed to things that are moonshine.

The next day, Sam apologizes to the sick Thomas for tricking him and cheers Thomas up by showing him something that is both real and fantastical, a baby gerbil found by her father that Thomas can keep as a pet.

Awards
Preceded by Always Room for One More	Caldecott Medal recipient 1967	Succeeded by Drummer Hoff
