= The Black Cauldron (video game) =

1985 video game

- Developer: Sierra On-Line
- Publisher: Sierra On-Line
- Producer: Joe Hale
- Designers: Al Lowe; Roberta Williams
- Programmers: Scott Murphy; Ken Williams; Al Lowe; Sol Ackerman
- Artist: Mark Crowe
- Engine: Adventure Game Interpreter
- Platforms: Amiga, Apple II, Apple IIGS, Atari ST, MS-DOS, Tandy 1000
- Release: October–December 1985
- Genre: Adventure
- Mode: Single-player

The Black Cauldron is an adventure game designed by Al Lowe of Sierra On-Line and published in 1985. The game is based on the Disney film The Black Cauldron, which was itself based on the Chronicles of Prydain novel of the same name by Lloyd Alexander. It was made shortly after the first King's Quest game, so it resembles that game in many ways. Along with The Dark Crystal it remained one of only a few adventure games by Sierra to be based on films.

== Plot ==
Atari ST screenshot

The player character is a young assistant pig-keeper named Taran, who undertakes a quest to stop the evil Horned King. The Horned King seeks Hen Wen, the magical pig of the wizard Dallben, for her oracular ability. Using Hen Wen, the Horned King can discover the location of the Black Cauldron and use its power to rule the land.

Taran's first mission is to lead Hen Wen to the Fair Folk while the Horned King's dragons are looking for them. Should the pig be captured (the game allows either possibility), Taran can go to the Horned King's castle and rescue her. As soon as he is inside, Taran will meet Princess Eilonwy with her magic bauble and may rescue Fflewddur Fflam, as well as discover a Magic Sword.

The Cauldron is in the possession of three witches of Morva who will trade it for the Sword. A dragon grasps the cauldron and Taran goes back to encounter the evil man himself.

There are plot branches and multiple endings depending on many variables, such as whether Hen Wen the pig was saved, how the cauldron was destroyed, and what reward was chosen afterward.

== Gameplay ==
In order to make the game more accessible to children, Sierra used an innovative idea that would not reappear in the genre for the next 10 years: the text parser was removed in favor of the function keys that performed various actions: F3 would choose an inventory item, F4 would use it, F6 would perform "Use" near the character's location, and F8 would "look". The simplification of the two actions "Look" and "Use" was not reused in Sierra's later games. However, it somewhat resembles the control system of other later simpler point-and-click adventure games, such as the King's Quest VII or The Dig whose interfaces only consisted of "Look" and "Use". Being based on a Disney film, the graphics present some relative 'flexibility', compared to the monolithic and straight sceneries of previous and later games.

== Development ==
During a gameplay walkthrough of King's Quest I, with Dan Avidan on the YouTube channel Game Grumps, Roberta Williams revealed that she almost quit Sierra when she received pushback from Disney executives during production of the game. According to Williams, the executives did not understand why Williams was deviating from the film's narrative by giving players the freedom to explore and make mistakes. The main character's ability to die when the player makes a mistake was also a big point of contention for the executives since the character does not die in the movie. The executives' unwillingness to understand the difference between a film and a video game led Williams to walk out of the meeting and threaten to leave the project until her husband Ken, head of Sierra, stepped in.

== Reception ==
Antic in 1987 criticized the Atari ST version of The Black Cauldron as "typical of early software for newer computers. It doesn't fully utilize the ST's capabilities", citing the "chunky low-resolution" graphics "obviously ported from another make of computer". However, the magazine concluded that fans of other Sierra adventures would enjoy the game.

== See also ==
- List of Disney video games
