= The High King =

1968 fantasy novel by Lloyd Alexander

- First edition cover
- Author: Lloyd Alexander
- Cover artist: Evaline Ness
- Language: English
- Series: The Chronicles of Prydain
- Genre: Fantasy
- Published: October 27, 1968
- Publisher: Holt, Rinehart and Winston
- Publication place: United States
- Media type: Print (hardcover & paperback)
- Pages: 288
- ISBN: 0-8050-1114-5 (first edition, hard)
- OCLC: 23225498
- LC Class: PZ7.A3774 Hi
- Preceded by: Taran Wanderer

The High King (1968) is a children's fantasy novel by American author Lloyd Alexander. It concludes the Chronicles of Prydain series and won the Newbery Medal for children's literature. In the series, main character Taran matures from an impulsive and childish Assistant Pig-Keeper to a colleague and counselor of kings. Throughout this installment, Taran is required to sacrifice his desires for the greater good. This arc leads him to become High King of Prydain. The novel also draws on Lloyd Alexander's life experiences, particularly as a soldier in the Second World War.

Scholarship and literary criticism of The High King have touched on numerous themes. These include meditations on masculinity, power, and maturation as well as broader analyses of American high fantasy. Reviews have been mixed, with some deeming the work juvenile and others considering it excellent.

== Background ==
While Alexander's experience in World War Two informs the Prydain series as a whole, some specific instances inspired events in The High King. One notable case is Alexander's involvement in Alsace-Lorraine under Alexander Patch directly inspiring an episode where Taran and the companions nearly freeze to death near Annuvin and fight in the snow. The action near Luneville, as well as the general icy and snowy conditions, caused Alexander great discomfort and served as direct inspiration for the episode.

== Plot ==
Taran and Gurgi return to Caer Dallben and are greeted by friends including Rhun (now King of Mona), Eilonwy, and the former giant (now returned to a diminutive size) Glew. Eilonwy presents Taran with an embroidery of Hen Wen, and the two are about to discuss their relationship. Suddenly, Fflewddur Fflam arrives bearing a wounded Gwydion. The bard is shocked that Taran has safely arrived at the farm, as Gwydion had been wounded rescuing Taran, with the magical sword Dyrnwyn being lost in the endeavor. Achren, the former sorceress and queen of Prydain, interrupts and explains that Arawn can shapeshift and therefore led the attack on Gwydion.

Distressed, Dallben and Coll ask Hen Wen, the white pig, to divine what they must do. Hen Wen delivers a cryptic prophecy and her oracular letter sticks shatter as she is revealing it, rendering her functionally mute. Determined, Gwydion, Coll, Gurgi and Taran head directly to King Smoit's lands while Rhun, Fflewddur, Glew and Eilonwy depart to communicate with Rhun's fleet. The groups plan to reunite at Caer Cadarn.

When Gwydion, Taran, Gurgi, and Coll arrive at the castle, they are captured by Magg. Magg has seized control of Smoit's dominion and declared his allegiance to Annuvin. The companions are imprisoned with Smoit in a larder and begin to plot. Meanwhile, Eilonwy, Glew, Rhun, and Fflewddur discover the situation and plan a rescue. This is aided by Gwystyl, who has left his waystation by Annuvin to report on Arawn's movements to the Fair Folk. With magical items from Gwystyl and the cover of night, Smoit's realm is liberated and he is restored to his throne. Unfortunately, Magg has escaped and Rhun has sacrificed his life for his friends. Taran and the remaining companions regroup and mourn.

Gwydion decides to rally the people of Prydain to war. He orders Smoit and Fflewddur to raise armies in their lands and among their allies while Taran, Coll, Gurgi, and Eilonwy go to bring the Free Commots to the banner of the Sons of Don and Gwystyl rouses the Fair Folk. Gwydion himself heads to Caer Dathyl and sends messages to King Pryderi of the West Domains and other leaders to alert them of the war. Meanwhile, unbeknownst to the heroes, Taran's crow Kaw reports to Medwyn, who begins organizing the animals to aid the resistance to the Death Lord.

Eilonwy's tapestry of Hen Wen becomes Taran's banner of the White Pig as they, Gurgi, and Coll collect the men and boys of the Free Commots in the army, including lucky Llonio. The Commots are raided by the forces of Annuvin, and Annlaw Clay-Shaper is slain. Taran leads the army to Caer Dathyl and reunites with Gwydion and his other friends. When Pryderi arrives, he is initially met with rejoicing until he declares that he is aligned with Arawn. Pryderi's forces are supplemented by Cauldron-Born. Caer Dathyl is razed, at the cost of the lives of many, including Llonio and the High King Math, and the Cauldron-Born force the remaining Sons of Don into the mountains.

Taran's army is tasked with harassing the Cauldron-Born on their return to Annuvin through the Red Fallows, while Gwydion's forces will launch an amphibious invasion of Annuvin. As Taran and the folk of the Free Commots fight the Cauldron-Born, they suffer significant losses, Coll among them. The army is saved by a legion of Fair Folk and by the beasts of Prydain. Eilonwy and Gurgi have been abducted by Dorath and his raiders, and Dorath threatens Eilonwy with sexual violence. Gurgi and Eilonwy are rescued by Medwyn's wolves, and the Fair Folk overcome Annuvin's Huntsmen. Eilonwy and Gurgi reunite with Taran and his friends, who have been separated from the army. Back at Caer Dallben, King Pryderi attempts to slay the enchanter Dallben and is struck down.

The Fair Folk leave Taran's group at the gates of Annuvin. In the midst of a snowstorm that threatens to kill the companions, Fflewddur sacrifices his magical harp to start a life-saving fire; as it burns, the harp sings beautifully. The group rejoins the Free Commots forces and commences the assault on Annuvin. Taran is saved from a fall by the gwythaint that he had saved years earlier and discovers Dyrnwyn. With it, he destroys the army of Cauldron-Born and enters Arawn's fortress.

Taran encounters Arawn, disguised as Gwydion, and drives him away. In the chaos, Magg attempts to seize the throne of Annuvin and dies. Achren also attacks Arawn and, as she dies, exposes Arawn to Taran's fatal strike with Dyrnwyn. Upon the victory over Arawn, Dallben, Gurgi, and the surviving Sons of Don (including Eilonwy and Fflewddur) prepare to leave for the Summer Country. Orddu, Orwen, and Orgoch bid Taran a final farewell. Taran turns down the invitation to the Summer Country, feeling he must help Prydain rebuild. Dallben then acclaims him as the prophesied High King of Prydain, and Eilonwy renounces the Summer Country to marry Taran. They reign as High King and Queen.

== Reception ==
Critically, The High King has attracted diverse reactions. One contemporary review, by Houston L. Maples, noted that "the [novel's] bald appeal to juvenile risibilities is, in the end, rather too calculated, and inconsistent with the eloquence and grandeur of the best episodes." Another, by Marjorie D. Hamlin, called the book "imaginative literature at its finest." Robert Ostermann, writing in The National Observer, said that Alexander's "kingdom and annals of Prydain are so complete, so compelling, that the reader leaves them for the last time with genuine regret." Also at the time of publication, Kirkus Reviews said: "The last may be the best--movement toward an ultimate confrontation between the forces of life and the forces of death give this final Prydain adventure a stronger frame and tighter weave than the preceding four." In a retrospective essay about the Newbery Medal-winning books from 1966 to 1975, children's author John Rowe Townsend wrote, "Yet when every allowance has been made, one faces, reluctantly, the fact that the Prydain saga, with its constant anachronism, its slack repetitive action, its cast of two-dimensional figures and failure to compel serious belief, is not a satisfying epic; not, I believe, a front-rank work. The High King, however, is probably the best of the five books."

Academically, The High King has garnered some attention. An example of this is the attention paid to Eilonwy and Taran's relationship. Writing for the Children's Literature Association Quarterly, Rona Glass contrasted it negatively with A Wrinkle in Time's depiction of gender relations. In her view, "Alexander has created a strong female of brave behavior [Eilonwy], scarcely a stereotype, but he allows Taran to treat her as if she were one... In such an otherwise excellent story, this is a great pity." According to Judith N. Mitchell, the novel argues for leadership that is "able to grieve with all who grieve; to be a symbol of striving, yet of never coming to terms with evil; always rallying those who look to him for inspiration, always consoling those who look to him for strength." In her reading, this is in line with the Arthurian tradition, particularly as adapted by T. H. White. Brian Attebery considers the end of the novel resonant with the forward facing ethos of American literature. He observes that "without ties or ancestry, and with a wife who renounces her own heritage, he [Taran] becomes King of Prydain and leads it into a new, unmagical age... Taran and Eilonwy stand together at the end of the story... ready to move together into a soberer world." Similarly, Cath Filmer-Davies writes that Taran becomes fully individuated by the end of High King; Taran's comfort as an Assistant Pig-Keeper reflects the maturity needed for the novel's vision of a leader. Kath Filmer-Davies compares the sober tone to C. S. Lewis's The Last Battle and notes that Alexander "shows that battles, while often necessary, can mean the death of a friend; and victory can often have a sour taste, even when 'good' wins over evil." In her view, this reflects Alexander's "humanist and universal" values.

== Sources ==
- Tuck, Donald H. (1974). The Encyclopedia of Science Fiction and Fantasy. Chicago: Advent. p. 6.

Awards
| Preceded by From the Mixed-Up Files of Mrs. Basil E. Frankweiler | Newbery Medal recipient 1969 | Succeeded by Sounder |
