= The Chronicles of Prydain =

Series of children's fantasy novels by Lloyd Alexander

- A complete set of The Chronicles of Prydain
- The Book of Three (1964); The Black Cauldron (1965); The Castle of Llyr (1966); Taran Wanderer (1967); The High King (1968)
- Author: Lloyd Alexander
- Illustrator: Evaline Ness (maps)
- Cover artist: Jean-León Huens
- Country: United States
- Language: English
- Genre: High fantasy, children's literature
- Publisher: Holt, Rinehart and Winston
- Published: 1964–1968
- Media type: Print (hardcover and paperback), audiobook, e-book
- No. of books: 5
- Followed by: The Foundling and Other Tales of Prydain

The Chronicles of Prydain is a five-part series of children's high fantasy coming-of-age novels written by American author Lloyd Alexander and published by Henry Holt and Company. The series includes: The Book of Three (1964), The Black Cauldron (1965), The Castle of Llyr (1966), Taran Wanderer (1967), and The High King (1968). The Black Cauldron earned a 1966 Newbery Honor, and The High King won the 1969 Newbery Medal.

The five novels take place in Prydain, a fictional country ruled by a High King who oversees several minor kingdoms. The setting is based on Wales and inhabited by creatures and characters inspired by Welsh mythology and folklore. The series follows the protagonist Taran, a youth of unknown parentage living on a farm with an old enchanter named Dallben and a farmer named Coll. Taran, who dreams of being a great hero, is named "Assistant Pig-Keeper" and tasked with helping to care for and protect Hen Wen, a white oracular pig magically empowered with clairvoyance. Taran has a series of adventures wherein he helps protect the land of Prydain from various threats, chief among them the evil Arawn, whose forces include an undead army known as the Cauldron-Born. Throughout the novels, Taran's major companions are the Princess Eilonwy, the bard Fflewddur Fflam, the wild beast-man Gurgi, and the dwarf Doli. The heroes frequently work alongside the Fair Folk (a society of elves and similar beings) and the warriors known as the Sons of Don. Along with various battles against forces of evil, the novels focus on Taran's journey of maturity.

The Chronicles of Prydain were accompanied by an illustrated short story book in 1965 and another in 1967, and were followed by The Foundling and Other Tales of Prydain, a collection of six short stories published in 1973. The cover art for the novels and the interior art for the short story picture books was done by Evaline Ness. New illustrations for the 1973 anthology were done by Margot Zemach. The first two novels of The Chronicles of Prydain were loosely adapted into the 1985 Disney film The Black Cauldron and led to a video game of the same name produced by Sierra Entertainment.

== Inspiration and development ==
During World War II, Lloyd Alexander received army combat intelligence training in Wales; he also became familiar with Welsh culture, geography, and language. He took particular interest in the country's castles and folklore, explaining later that he was "always interested in mythology". Alexander later described his experiences in Wales as "part of the raw material for the Prydain books".

The magical land Prydain's geography is loosely based on Wales. Ynys Môn, the Welsh name for the Isle of Anglesey, became the Isle of Mona. The word Prydain itself is the Welsh name of Britain, to which the word "Britain" is etymologically related.

The stories draw on themes, ideas, and culture inspired by Welsh folklore, particularly the stories collected in the Mabinogion. According to Alexander, nearly all of the proper names in Prydain are from Welsh myth or history, with the exceptions of Eilonwy and Taran. The author's note in the first novel, The Book of Three, points out the Prydain stories and characters are his own and not simply retellings of old folklore, adding that students of Welsh culture should be prepared to see familiar names such as Arawn and Gwydion attached to characters who act very differently from their mythological namesakes. In the author's note for The Castle of Lyr, Alexander said The Prydain Chronicles are meant to communicate "the feeling, not the fact, of the land of Wales and its legends". In the author's note for The High King, Alexander said of the series, "While it grew from Welsh legend, it has broadened into my attempt to make a land of fantasy relevant to the world of reality."

Originally, Alexander planned to write only one or two Prydain novels, "three at the very most". At one point, the plan was for a trilogy of books that would be entitled The Battle of the Trees, The Lion with the Steady Hand, and Little Gwion. By 1965, a four novel series was planned with new titles. The first novel, The Book of Three, was released by Holt and Company in 1964, followed by The Black Cauldron in 1965, and The Castle of Lyr in 1966. Originally, the fourth novel was meant to be titled The High King of Prydain. But as Alexander finished The Castle of Lyr, an editor remarked that it felt as if some material was missing between the third and fourth volumes. To act as a bridge between the two and show more of Taran's journey to maturity, Alexander started writing a new novel Taran Wanderer, finishing it one month after The Castle of Llyr was published in 1966. The new book Taran Wanderer was published in 1967. The next novel, entitled The High King, was published in 1968, concluding the now five-volume series. The High King included a map illustrated by Evaline Ness, who also did the cover art for the original novel editions.

While writing the series, Lloyd Alexander also published short stories taking place in Prydain, occurring before the events of the novels. This included Coll and His White Pig (1965) and The Truthful Harp (1967), both being 32-page picture books illustrated by Evaline Ness.

The Foundling and Other Tales of Prydain was published in 1973 as a collection of six new short stories of Prydain, illustrated by Margot Zemach, with a reproduction of a map from The High King illustrated by Evaline Ness. It was dedicated to "Friends of Prydain, who promised to read more if I would write more". In the collection, Alexander remarked "popular demand makes a splendid pretext" for a return to the fictional world of Prydain but not for covering the same ground, hence his decision to make the stories prequels.

The Prydain Chronicles Omnibus (1991) comprises the five novels and the material of the original edition of The Foundling, but not the stories of the first two illustrated picture books.

In 1999, Holt and Company published an expanded edition of The Foundling that included the original book's material while adding the short stories (but not the illustrations) of Coll and his White Pig and The Truthful Harp, along with a new "Prydain Pronunciation Guide" with entries for 49 proper names. The Pronunciation Guide was included in later editions of the main five novels, as was Ness's map.

In 1999, Alexander explained to Scholastic students: "The High King was the final logical development of the first four books in the Prydain Chronicles. It was not an easy book to write, but at least I was building on a foundation that I had already made. I never considered a different ending." He added that after writing The Chronicles of Prydain for seven years, "the characters were as close to me as my own family... I wept at the end – to see Taran confronted with such a brutally difficult decision".

== Setting ==
Map of Prydain by Evaline Ness, from The High King.

Once ruled over by the evil sorceress Queen Achren, Prydain is now under the authority of the just High King, a member of the family known as the Children of Don, descendants of Lady Don and her consort, Belin. The High King and his warriors, known as the Sons of Don, are based in the stronghold called Caer Dathyl. The rest of Prydain is divided into territories and minor kingdoms (called cantrevs) ruled by many lower kings who owe their loyalty to the High King. A collection of villages called the Free Commots exist outside any cantrev's jurisdiction, answering only to the High King.

The evil Queen Achren was overthrown by her consort and student in magic, Arawn. Taking the Iron Crown, Arawn became master of the fortress of Annuvin, the Land of the Dead. Arawn's warriors include the Cauldron-Born, undead soldiers reanimated by the Black Cauldron; the Horned King, a fearsome commander; and the Huntsmen of Annuvin, who transfer their power to their comrades when killed. Arawn also corrupts a race of birds into the Gwythaints, monstrous airborne agents. When the first novel begins, Arawn and the Horned King are making new plans to conquer Prydain.

Underneath and within Prydain is the kingdom of the Fair Folk, a society of diminutive supernatural beings that use magic to stay hidden and mostly keep to their own affairs. Having no love for Arawn, the Fair Folk occasionally aid the humans of Prydain against him.

Significant locations in Prydain include: Caer Dallben, the home of series protagonist Taran, his mentor Dallben, and the retired warrior Coll; Caer Colur, which stands near the Isle of Mona and is the ancestral home of the House of Llyr; the Spiral Castle, fortress of the sorceress Achren; Annuvin, fortress of Arawn; and the Marshes of Morva, a haunted swamp inhabited by the witches Orddu, Orwen and Orgoch.

In addition to the races of humans and Fair Folk, Prydain is home to many strange creatures, such as Gurgi.

== Publications ==
=== Novels ===
==== The Book of Three (1964) ====
Taran, a young boy in his early or mid-teens, lives with his mentor Dallben, a 379 year old enchanter, and the aged farmer and retired warrior Coll, son of Collfrewr. Named "Assistant Pig-Keeper," Taran is charged with caring for Hen Wen, a magical white pig. Quickly losing the pig and following it into a forest, Taran meets Prince Gwydion, son of the High King of Prydain, who hopes to consult Hen Wen's prophetic visions. After befriending a creature called Gurgi, Taran is captured by the "Cauldron-Born," the undead warriors of the Horned King. Escaping imprisonment, Taran finds the legendary sword Dyrnwyn and befriends Eilonwy, a princess from a family of enchantresses, and Fflewddur Fflam, a king by birth who chooses to be a bard. Together, the new companions (later joined by the dwarf Doli) determine to stop the plans of the Horned king and his master Arawn, Lord of the Land of Death.

==== The Black Cauldron (1965) ====
A little over one year after the events of The Book of Three, Prince Gwydion has called allies to a council hosted by Dallben. Men are disappearing while more undead Cauldron-Born join the forces of Arawn. Taran and companions embark on a mission to capture the Black Cauldron and stop the creation of more undead warriors. They encounter three witches in the Marshes of Morva, and battle the Huntsmen of Annuvin, fearsome warriors who can lend each other their strength and power.

The Black Cauldron won a Newbery Honor in 1966.

==== The Castle of Llyr (1966) ====
Eighteen months after the end of The Black Cauldron, Eilonwy of the House of Llyr is encouraged to go to the royal court of the Isle of Mona to continue her education as a proper princess. During her journey, she befriends Prince Rhun. Later on, she is kidnapped, leading Taran, Rhun and others to embark on a rescue mission. During the adventure, the companions learn more of Eilonwy's magical heritage and find the ruins of her ancestral home.

==== Taran Wanderer (1967) ====
Approximately one year after The Castle of Llyr, Taran has realized he is in love with Eilonwy but is afraid he can never marry her, as he is of common birth. In the hopes that he might have some noble blood in him, he searches for the truth about his parentage. Meanwhile, a human wizard named Morda is raiding the underground realms of the Fair Folk. While journeying among the cantrevs and commots of Prydain, Taran increases his knowledge in a variety of skills, maturing greatly along the way and gaining new confidence in himself.

==== The High King (1968) ====
Days after the conclusion of Taran Wanderer, Taran returns home and learns that Eilonwy has returned from the Isle of Mona, now ruled by King Rhun. Servants of Arawn assault the warrior Gwydion and seize the magical black sword Dyrnwyn. Taran and his companions join other forces of Prydain to defeat Arawn once and for all.

The High King won the prestigious Newbery Medal for children's literature in 1969.

=== Short stories ===
Coll and His White Pig (1965). A 32-page picture book written by Alexander and illustrated by Evaline Ness. The book features Coll as a younger man, years before he meets Taran.

The Truthful Harp (1967). A 32-page picture book written by Alexander and illustrated by Evaline Ness. A story of Fflewddur Fflam when he is a younger man, many years before he meets Taran.

The Foundling and Other Tales of Prydain (1973). An anthology of six new short stories by Alexander, all illustrated by Margot Zemach. It was dedicated to "Friends of Prydain, who promised to read more if I would write more." All six stories explore a time "before the birth of Taran, Assistant Pig-Keeper," meaning they take place at least fifteen years before the events of the first novel. An expanded edition was published in 1999, adding the original two short stories Coll and his White Pig and The Truthful Harp, but not including the illustrations Ness made for those picture books.

=== Omnibus ===
The Prydain Chronicles Omnibus (1991) comprises the five novels and the six later short stories, but not the stories of the first two illustrated picture books. Each novel includes a Prydain map by Evaline Ness (original illustrator of the picture books and covers of the novels) and each story includes the illustrations by Margot Zemach for the original Foundling and Other Tales.

=== References ===
In 1989, Greenwood Publishing Group published The Prydain Companion: A Reference Guide to Lloyd Alexander's Prydain Chronicles by children's literature scholar Michael O. Tunnell. Henry Holt, the original publisher of the Prydain books, republished The Prydain Companion in 2003. The book includes a biographical sketch of Alexander and two sections by Alexander, the "Foreword" and "How to Use the Companion." Entries cover major characters, locations, and so on, with insight gained by Tunnell's interviews with Alexander as well as research into the Mabinogion and The White Goddess. One marketing capsule is "An informative resource for formal studies of the Prydain Chronicles, as well as an excellent opportunity to delve into the fantastic workings of Prydain."

== Adaptations ==
=== Film ===
Walt Disney Productions released a Prydain animated film in 1985. The Black Cauldron is based primarily on the first two novels while incorporating elements from the others. The movie had a production budget of $44 million, while its theatrical release grossed only $21 million in the United States. The film received mixed reviews from critics who found the film "pretty, but confusing and overly somber" due to its dark nature and disjointed script, though Roger Ebert gave it a positive review. Production delays and its disappointing box office performance put the future of the Disney animation studio department in jeopardy. Then newly appointed studio head Jeffrey Katzenberg was dismayed by the product, and the animators felt that it lacked "the humor, pathos, and the fantasy which had been so strong in Lloyd Alexander's work. The story had been a once-in-a-lifetime opportunity and it was heartbreaking to see such wonderful material wasted".

Of the film, Lloyd Alexander remarked: "First, I have to say, there is no resemblance between the movie and the book. Having said that, the movie in itself, purely as a movie, I found to be very enjoyable."

On March 17, 2016, Variety confirmed that Walt Disney Pictures had re-acquired the film rights to The Chronicles of Prydain, with the intention to adapt the book series into an epic live-action motion picture series, more attuned to Lloyd Alexander's high fantasy world. The project was said to be in early development at the Walt Disney Studios with no director, producer, or screenwriter attached yet.

=== Audiobook ===
Early in the 2000s, Listening Library (Random House) produced an unabridged reading by James Langton of the five main volumes, with author's notes read by Lloyd Alexander himself. The audiobooks were published on compact audio cassette and compact disc, and were also released for download from 2004 to 2005. In May 2017, an audiobook adaptation of The Foundling and Other Tales of Prydain was released in a digital format. This edition was also read by James Langton.

== Reception ==
Having garnered a Newbery Medal and a Newbery Honor, The Chronicles of Prydain series is widely recognized as a valuable contribution to children's literature. Ruth Hill Viguers wrote in the 1969 Critical History of Children's Literature, "Like most good fantasies, the books are related to humanity; the characters have failings but also the potential for greatness."

In 2012, The Book of Three was ranked #18, and The High King #68, among the all-time best children's novels in a survey published by School Library Journal, a monthly with primarily U.S. audience.

== Characters ==
Characters are grouped by the book in which they first appear.

=== The Book of Three ===
- Taran is an assistant pig-keeper. The main protagonist of The Prydain Chronicles, he is a young man who grows from early adolescence to adulthood over the course of the series. Initially defensive, quick-tempered, and impulsive, he matures over the series and makes it a point to improve himself and increase his knowledge. His true parentage a mystery, Taran is mentored by the ancient enchanter Dallben and the two live together in Caer Dallben at a farm owned by the warrior-turned-farmer Coll. Initially unsatisfied with his life as a farmhand, Taran longs to be a hero who finds glory in adventures. By the end of the first book, he reconsiders this opinion and realizes he is happiest living a simple life on the farm Caer Dallben and wants to remain there. Despite this, he is later called back to adventure again.
- Dallben is the 379-year-old protector and mentor of Taran and guardian of Hen Wen. Some recognize him as the most powerful enchanter in Prydain, and while his displays of power are quite potent, they are used sparingly.
- Coll is a retired warrior of great skill who lives at his farm in Caer Dallben, acting as caretaker for the oracular pig Hen Wen. On meeting the enchanter Dallben, he allows the ancient man and Taran to take up residence at the farm. When Taran is in his mid-teens, Coll passes many of Hen Wen's responsibilities to him, naming the boy "Assistant Pig-Keeper."
- Hen Wen is a white pig with the ability to prophesy future events and reveal hidden information. Hen Wen originally belongs to a simple farmer but the Death-Lord Arawn learns of her oracular power and captures her. She suffers for some time as a prisoner in the dark fortress Annuvin. The warrior Coll eventually journeys into Annuvin alone and rescues the pig, becoming her caretaker. When Coll retires, he keeps her on his farm. Taran and Dallben help look after her after they take residence at the farm. When Taran is a teenager, Coll jokingly bestows on him the official title of Assistant Pig-Keeper. Hen Wen goes missing at the beginning of The Book of Three, which causes a chain of events that puts Taran on the path of becoming a hero.
- Princess Eilonwy is a princess of the House of Llyr, whose women are formidable enchantresses. She befriends Taran in the first book and over the years they develop romantic feelings for each other. Eilonwy is the daughter of Angharad, who in turn is the daughter of Regat. Against her mother's wishes, Angharad married a commoner named Geraint, Eilonwy's father. Smart and witty, she is also considered by some to be scatterbrained. She often employs unusual similes and metaphors. She prefers to go barefoot and favors sandals if she must wear shoes. She carries with her the Golden Pelydryn, a magical bauble that has been in her family for generations.
- Fflewddur Fflam is a cantrev lord of Prydain, he is a minor king of a tiny kingdom. With few responsibilities and believing his people get along fine without him, he often leaves his kingdom, preferring to wander as a bard. Although he is prone to boasting, the strings of his enchanted "truthful harp" break whenever he tells a lie, sometimes forcing him to be honest.
- Gurgi is a good-natured and "ever hungry" humanoid covered with fur and leaves. Often referring to himself in the third person, his manner of speech is filled with rhymed pairs of words ("crunchings and munchings", "smackings and whackings", "sneakings and peekings"), and redundant phrases ("see with lookings"). Gurgi is humble and loyal toward his human companions, at first submitting even to Taran as a "noble lord". In the course of the Chronicles, he plays a highly important role by accidentally finding hidden items which ultimately occupy a vital role in the stories.
- Doli is one of the Fair Folk, a society of magical beings who live in an extensive underground kingdom spanning the entire country of Prydain. Doli is described as a short, stocky dwarf who carries a number of weapons and is adept in hunting, fighting, and stealth. Originally, he is said to be the only one of his kin who does not have the power to turn himself invisible. After aiding Taran's companions and the House of Don in The Book of Three, he is rewarded by Gwydion with invisibility, although each use causes an uncomfortable sensation inside his ears.
- King Eiddileg is the reclusive leader of the Fair Folk. He aids Taran and his allies in numerous battles against the forces of Annuvin.
- Gwydion is the prince of Don and heir of King Math of Prydain. He is the war leader of the House of Don against the forces of Annuvin, and rides a horse named Melyngar. He befriends Taran in The Book of Three and accompanies him on several adventures.
- Math is the son of Mathonwy. The High King of Prydain, Math rules above all lesser kings in the country and is the patriarch of the Royal House of Don, the descendants of the Lady Don and her consort, Belin, the Sun king. A just ruler, Math's leadership helps keep Arawn the Death-Lord partly in check. He dwells in the stronghold Caer Dathyl, the castle of the Children of Don that lies north of the Eagle Mountains.
- The Horned King is Arawn's champion and the war leader of the Death-Lord's forces. He is described as a huge man wearing armor, except for his arms, which are naked and stained red. Along with this, he wears a red cape and an antlered skull mask.
- Achren is the former Queen of Prydain. Her tyrannical rule was ended by her former consort and student Arawn, who took the Iron Crown from her. Living as Arawn's subject in the Spiral Castle, she despises the Death-Lord and makes her own plans to take over Prydain, while finding herself drawn to and protective of Gwydion.
- Arawn was originally a mortal man and gained magical powers by being tutored by the evil Queen Achren during her time as ruler of Prydain. After growing powerful as her consort, Arawn overthrows Achren and takes the Iron Crown from her. After gaining possession of the Black Cauldron, he creates a powerful undead army known as the Cauldron-Born. He then attempts to conquer Prydain, often defied by the Sons of Don.

=== The Black Cauldron ===
- King Smoit is the boisterous lord of Cantrev Cadiffor and one of the only Southern Cantrevs to remain loyal to the High King.
- King Morgant is the ruler of the kingdom of Madoc.
- Gwystyl is one of the Fair Folk, described as resembling "a bundle of sticks with cobwebs floating at the top." Gwystyl lives in a hidden underground waypost near the border of Annuvin.
- Kaw is a crow who was originally the pet of Gwystyl before being given to Taran. Kaw can talk, although only in one-word statements. He has a mischievous temperament, often playing tricks on his human friends and talking more freely than he should.
- Ellidyr is a prince whose father left him only "his name and his sword". He is deeply sensitive about his poverty.
- Adaon is a gifted minstrel, warrior, and healer with a distinctive brooch that bestows prophetic dreams.
- Orddu, Orwen and Orgoch are three witches who live alone in the Marshes of Morva. Orwen wears a necklace of milky stones, Orddu's hair is adorned with many ornaments, and Orgoch's face is shadowed by a black cowl. They were the original owners of the Black Cauldron and lent it to Arawn, who used it to create the Cauldron-Born. The witches trade information and advice to anyone brave enough to enter their domain, though they nearly always ask for a magical price. Many years ago, they acted as guardians of Dallben when they found him as an abandoned infant near the marsh.
- The Huntsmen of Annuvin are a band of wild, merciless fighters notorious for their endurance, tenacity, and bloodthirst. They serve in Arawn's army, each branded with the mark of Annuvin on their foreheads. When one is killed, their strength is magically transferred to their nearby comrades, making the Huntsmen stronger as their numbers dwindle.

=== The Castle of Llyr ===
- Prince Rhun is the only son of King Rhuddlum and Queen Teleria, who rule over the Isle of Mona. Cheerful and altruistic, he is also clumsy and accident-prone, with others believing he must mature before taking the throne. He is first introduced in The Castle of Llyr when Eilonwy is sent by Dallben to live at the castle and gain a "proper" upbringing.
- Chief Steward Magg is a respected man on the Isle of Mona who becomes increasingly power-hungry and focused on his own desires.
- Glew is a small man who turned to magical potions to increase his physical size, first testing it on a wild cat. Prone to self-pity and desperation, he later works to improve his personality rather than his body.
- Llyan is a female orange cat who becomes larger than a horse due to an experimental growth potion created by Glew. Won over by Fflewddur's music, she serves as his steed.

=== Taran Wanderer ===
- Aeddan is a farmer who shelters Taran while he searches for his parents.
- Dorath is a treacherous bandit and mercenary. His unofficial second-in-command is the bandit Gloff.
- Craddoc is an old shepherd who claims a connection to Taran.
- Llonio is the son of Llonwen. Unusually lucky, he and his family spend their days waiting for whatever comes their way.
- Hevydd is an expert metalsmith who teaches sword forging to Taran.
- Dwyvach is an expert weaver who teaches her skills to Taran.
- Annlaw is an expert potter from Commot Merin who teaches pottery to Taran. Taran considers Annlaw to be the wisest of his Commot teachers.
- Llassar is the son of Drudwas. Young and enthusiastic to prove himself as a man, he is a mirror image of Taran in his own younger years. His knowledge of mountain craft proves vital.
- Morda is an evil sorcerer who wishes to attain ultimate power.

=== The High King ===
- King Pryderi is the son of Pwyll and king of the Western Realms. He becomes increasingly convinced that only extreme measures will bring order to Prydain.
