= The Book of Three =

1964 fantasy novel by Lloyd Alexander

- First edition dustjacket with Ness artwork
- Author: Lloyd Alexander
- Cover artist: Evaline Ness
- Series: The Chronicles of Prydain
- Genre: Children's literature, fantasy
- Publisher: Holt, Rinehart and Winston
- Publication date: March 12, 1964
- Publication place: United States
- Media type: Print (hardcover)
- Pages: 217 (first edition)
- ISBN: 0-8050-0874-8
- OCLC: 17720934
- LC Class: PZ8.A37 Bo
- Followed by: The Black Cauldron

The Book of Three is a high fantasy novel written in 1964 by American writer Lloyd Alexander, the first of five volumes in The Chronicles of Prydain. The series follows the adventures of Taran, the Assistant Pig-Keeper, a youth raised by Dallben the enchanter, as he nears manhood while helping to resist the forces of Arawn Death-Lord.

The book provided many elements of plot for the 1985 Disney animated feature The Black Cauldron.

== Origins ==
The series was inspired by Welsh mythology and by the castles, scenery, and language of Wales, which the author experienced during World War II army combat intelligence training. The planned title of the first book was originally The Battle of the Trees.

== Plot ==
The youth Taran lives at Caer Dallben with his guardians, the ancient enchanter Dallben and the farmer and retired soldier Coll. Taran is dissatisfied with his life and longs to become a great hero like the High Prince Gwydion. Due to the threat posed by a warlord known as the Horned King, servant of the evil Arawn Death-Lord of Annuvin, Taran is forbidden from leaving the farm and charged with the care of Hen Wen, the oracular white pig. When Hen Wen inexplicably panics and escapes, Taran follows her into the Forbidden Forest. After a long, fruitless chase, he is attacked by a host of horsemen galloping toward Caer Dallben, led by the Horned King himself. Taran manages to escape but drops to the ground, wounded. He awakes to find his wound treated by Gwydion, the crown prince in Prydain's ruling House of Don, who has been travelling to Caer Dallben to consult Hen Wen. Gwydion, determined to find the pig, takes Taran along with him. Guided by Gurgi, a hairy humanoid living in the forest, they reach the Horned King's camp and learn that his target will be Caer Dathyl, the home castle of the House of Don. Gwydion determines to warn the royal court, but the group is attacked by Arawn's undead Cauldron-Born soldiers, who capture Gwydion and Taran, and take them to Queen Achren in Spiral Castle.

The sorceress asks Gwydion to help her overthrow Arawn—her former apprentice and consort who usurped her throne and claimed the Iron Crown of Annuvin for his own—and to join her in ruling Prydain together. When Gwydion refuses, he is imprisoned, but not in the same place as Taran. Princess Eilonwy, who was sent by her kinsmen as a young girl to learn enchantment from Achren, visits Taran's dungeon cell, and agrees to free first his companion, and then him. While travelling through a labyrinth of tunnels to join Gwydion and his horse Melyngar outside the castle, Taran and Eilonwy steal weapons from a tomb. As they emerge into the woods, Spiral Castle collapses; they later learn that this is because the weapon Eilonwy has taken is the legendary sword Dyrnwyn. Eilonwy has misunderstood Taran's request to free his companion, for the man waiting outside is not Gwydion, but another former prisoner of the castle: Fflewddur Fflam, a king by birth but a wandering bard by choice. The three search the ruins, then mourn Gwydion's presumed death, and decide to take up his task to warn Caer Dathyl.

Rejoined by Gurgi, but pursued by the Cauldron-Born, the group is driven far east of their northward course, and ends up in the underground realm of the Fair Folk, who have rescued Hen Wen. The Fair Folk's King Eiddileg grudgingly agrees to let Taran have her back, re-equip their party, and provide a guide, a dwarf called Doli. On their journey to Caer Dathyl, against Fflewddur and Doli's advice, Taran rescues an injured fledgling gwythaint, one of the great birds of prey that Arawn has enslaved. The gwythaint recovers quickly and escapes overnight, shortly followed by Hen Wen, who flees just before the Horned King's army spots them all. Fflewddur, Doli, and Gurgi stand to fight, while Taran and Eilonwy go ahead on Melyngar, with the Horned King in pursuit. On top of a hill, the Horned King attacks them and breaks Taran's sword on the first blow. Taran seizes Dyrnwyn from Eilonwy, but lacks the "noble birth" needed to draw it. White flame burns his arm and throws him to the ground. Just before losing consciousness, Taran sees another man in the trees and hears an unintelligible word. The Horned King's mask melts, and he bursts into flame.

When Taran awakens in Caer Dathyl, he learns that the man who destroyed the Horned King was Gwydion, who had been with Achren at another stronghold when Spiral Castle fell. After withstanding Achren's torture, he learned to understand the hearts of all creatures and was able to communicate first with the gwythaint, and then with Hen Wen after finding them in the forest. From the oracular pig, he learned how to destroy the Horned King by saying his secret name. Recognizing his nobility, Eilonwy gives Dyrnwyn to him, while Taran and his companions are to receive treasures from Caer Dathyl in recognition of service to the House of Don. Eilonwy receives a ring made by the Fair Folk, Gurgi a wallet of food that cannot be depleted, Fflewddur a golden harp string that can never break, and Doli the ability to turn invisible (which he unusually lacks). Taran—who, in the course of his adventures, has realized that Caer Dallben is where he most wants to be—asks only to return home. Gwydion accompanies him back to Caer Dallben, along with Eilonwy, Hen Wen, and Gurgi, who take up residence there as well. Dallben tells Taran Eilonwy can stay at Caer Dallben.

== Reception ==
In 2012, The Book of Three was ranked number 18 among all-time best children's novels in a survey published by School Library Journal, a monthly with primarily U.S. audience. Ruth Hill Viguers of The Horn Book Magazine said the book would "wear well, and that children will be eager for other stories in which Taran may yet learn the meaning of heroism". The Junior Bookshelf criticized the supporting characters, the contrived and excessive use of humor, and the heavy-use of lessons. Margery Fisher in Growing Point, criticized the novel for being too derivative of Tolkien, Garner, Masefield, and T. H. White and that, "perhaps with only one of these models or influences, it would be better". The Times Literary Supplement called the novel "a very fine fantasy-adventure", admitting that the book does not compare to the works of Tolkien, but has "quite a compelling magic of its own". The School Library Journal called the novel, "one of the most iconic and influential works of middle-grade fiction from the 20th century", which "helped pave the way for countless fantasy adventures".

== Adaptations ==
The Book of Three and its successor, The Black Cauldron, were loosely adapted by Walt Disney Productions and released in 1985 under the latter title. Gross receipts for The Black Cauldron did not match its production costs, resulting in it being labeled a great commercial failure. Lloyd Alexander's reaction was twofold: "First, I have to say, there is no resemblance between the movie and the book. Having said that, the movie in itself, purely as a movie, I found to be very enjoyable."
