= The Foundling and Other Tales of Prydain =

1973 short story collection by Lloyd Alexander

- Cover of the first edition with Zemach artwork
- Author: Lloyd Alexander
- Illustrator: Margot Zemach (first)
- Cover artist: Sasha Meret (expanded); Margot Zemach
- Series: The Chronicles of Prydain
- Genre: Children's fantasy collection
- Publisher: Henry Holt (expanded); Holt, Rinehart and Winston
- Publication date: 1999 (expanded); 1973
- Publication place: United States
- Media type: Print (hardback & paperback)
- Pages: xi+98 (expanded) vii+87
- ISBN: 0-8050-6130-4 (expanded); ISBN 0-03-007431-2
- OCLC: 614293
- LC Class: PZ7.A3774 Fno 1999; PZ8.A37 Fo

The Foundling and Other Tales of Prydain is a collection of short high fantasy stories for children by Lloyd Alexander and illustrator Margot Zemach. The 1973 first edition includes six stories; the 1982 edition, eight. The 1999 edition adds a map of Prydain and a pronunciation guide . All are prequels to The Chronicles of Prydain, Alexander's award-winning series of five novels published 1964 to 1968.

== Expanded contents ==
- Author's Note (1973) (Note: Expanded edition, title leaf: lists copyrights 1965, 1967, 1973 Lloyd Alexander; 1999 copyrights only Henry Holt, compilation and pronunciation guide. Inspection supports the implication that dedication and author's note date from 1973.)
- Map (copyright 1968, Evaline Ness)
- The Foundling
- The Stone
- The True Enchanter
- The Rascal Crow
- The Sword
- The Smith, the Weaver, and the Harper
- Coll and His White Pig
- The Truthful Harp
- Prydain Pronunciation Guide (1999)
- About the Author (1973) (Note: Expanded edition, About the author: This short two-page sketch ends at Alexander following The Chronicles with the first Foundling collection in 1973.)

Coll and His White Pig (1965) and The Truthful Harp (1967) were 32-page picture books illustrated by Evaline Ness. They feature as younger adults two of Taran's human companions in The Chronicles. Six new stories constituted the first Foundling collection, published in 1973 and dedicated to "Friends of Prydain, who promised to read more if I would write more". The author then cited "many readers of all ages" and explained that "popular demand makes a splendid pretext" for return to Prydain, but all the stories (six) explore prehistory, "before the birth of Taran Assistant Pig-Keeper". The expanded Foundling in 1982 collected all eight stories, while the 1999 edition included an old map of Prydain by Ness and a new pronunciation guide as well.

== Stories ==
"The Foundling"

The hags Orddu, Orwen and Orgoch find a baby boy in a basket by the marsh, name him Dallben, take him in, and raise him to youth as a willing helper without knowledge of the outside world. When a boiling potion splashes his fingers, he pops them into his mouth and gains "learning along with [the pain]". He knows too much and must leave, albeit with a choice of parting gifts. He declines a magic sword and magic harp that would make him the greatest warrior or greatest bard and takes the massive "Book of Three", which "holds everything that was ever known, is known, and will be known". At first reading it brings Dalben great joy, but as he turns the pages and reads of war, cruelty and death, he collapses with grief; reading the last pages, he reads of rebirth and renewal, and realizes there is hope. Reaching the end of his journey, and the book, he finds he has aged into a grey old man.

"The Stone"

The farmer Maibon meets Dallben on foot, and suddenly fears aging. Fortunately he saves Doli of the Fair Folk from a fallen tree and thus earns a favor. He demands a legendary stone that keeps its owner from aging, and insists despite warnings. His chickens' eggs do not hatch, his cow does not calve, his crops do not grow, and his baby does not teethe. He throws it away, but not far away, and it returns. He tries and fails to destroy it. He meets the dwarf again, and his anger earns him a short lecture, but Doli says that all his earlier attempts to lose or destroy the stone have failed because he does not really wish to be parted from it. Flinging it away, this time in earnest, Maibon runs home and is overjoyed to see life returned to normal. As he ages, his children mature and bear him grandchildren, and he jokes to one of them, "stones are all right in their way; the trouble is, they don't grow."

"The True Enchanter"

Queen Regat calls for "enchanters of the highest skill" to apply for marriage to Princess Angharad. She is not impressed by two who labor at genuine sorcery and falls in love with one who speaks in "common, quiet words" and admits, "I only helped you imagine these things to be more than what they are." They elope and the spells of the sorcerers do not touch them.

"The Rascal Crow"

Medwyn once built a ship and saved the animals of Prydain from a great flood. He calls them to council and warns of the new danger, Arawn who plans to make them slaves. They all explain how their kinds will help resist, while Kadwyr the crow taunts them one by one, for he believes he is both safest and most capable, with his sturdy nest, speed aflight, keen eye, and sharp beak. When the hunter does arrive, Kadwyr toys with him but carelessly breaks a wing and must flee on foot. He is saved by the gnats, the spiders, and finally by the turtle.

"The Sword"

The magical sword of the Kings of Prydain, Dyrnwyn passes to Rhitta when he is crowned, already a legend poorly understood. Hunting for pleasure one day, the king's mounted party ruins a sheepfold. The king makes light of it and gives Amrys the shepherd "my word it will be made right." When he returns hawking, the sheep have escaped, but a reminder only angers the king. He gives time to pressing business, pleasant feasts, and policy of state, and slays the shepherd in a rage when Amrys admonishes him in court.

The king announces compensation for the family, but a dark stain of blood appears on Dyrnwyn's scabbard. When no kin can be found, a quarrel over the man's land grows into rebellion and war. Rhitta becomes a tyrant by day and a haunted man by night. The stain spreads and he can no longer draw the sword. He builds myriad chambers underground, sleeps with a bodyguard, and moves to a new one every night. Finally he seizes the sword to strike the ghost of Amrys and flame from the hilt kills everyone in the room. They are never uncovered, and only Amrys grieves for Rhitta in death.

"The Smith, the Weaver, and the Harper"

Arawn ventures from Annuvin in human disguises to steal the magical equipment used by Prydain's greatest craftsmen. He tricks Iscovan the smith to trade his hammer and Follin the weaver to trade his shuttle but Menwy the bard perceives the truth and declines to trade his harp. Arawn strikes and shatters it, but Menwy laughs in defiance, saying the music of life is all around them, in the forest and its animals, and Arawn flees in terror.

"Coll and His White Pig"

The warrior Coll has retired to farming. Horsemen steal his white pig Hen Wen and he follows on foot until he must rest under a hazelnut tree, whose fruit he eats. He rescues a baby owl and learns from its father that every nut he has eaten is "a day given you to understand the speech of birds and animals". The owl joins his quest, as do the stag and mole he rescues along the way. They find Hen Wen captive in a pit of Annuvin, where the owl and stag lead away the hunting birds and horsemen of Arawn. Coll jumps into the pit and escapes with his pig through a tunnel dug by thousands of moles. Back home his fields and gardens have flourished, for the enchanter Dallben has moved in during his absence.

"The Truthful Harp"

Fflewddur Fflam has a tiny kingdom where he is more friend than ruler. He studies to be a bard, and boasts his prowess, but fails the oral exam and fumbles his harp, which shatters. He departs with a magical harp and "much to learn". As he wanders, he gives his cloak to a poor man, saves a child from a river in flood, and rescues from ambush a lord who had beaten him. A harpstring snaps whenever he stretches the truth, most notably when he belittles his own good deeds.

== Sources ==
- Alexander, Lloyd (1973). The Foundling, and Other Tales of Prydain. New York: Holt, Rinehart and Winston. ISBN 0-03-007431-2.
- Alexander, Lloyd (1982). The Foundling, and Other Tales of Prydain. New York: Dell Publishing. ISBN 0-440-42536-0.
- Alexander, Lloyd (1999). The Foundling and Other Tales of Prydain. New York: Henry Holt and Company. ISBN 0-8050-6130-4.
