= Taran (character) =

Fictional Character

- The Chronicles of Prydain character
- Taran, from the cover of the 1980 Laurel-Leaf edition of The High King.
- First appearance: The Book of Three (1964)
- Last appearance: The Foundling and Other Tales of Prydain
- Created by: Lloyd Alexander
- Voiced by: Grant Bardsley

In-universe information
- Title(s): Assistant Pig-Keeper; High King of Prydain
- Spouse: Princess Eilonwy of Llyr

Taran is a fictional character from Lloyd Alexander's The Chronicles of Prydain series of novels. Serving as the series's central protagonist, he is first introduced as the assistant pig-keeper at Caer Dallben charged with the care of Hen Wen, the oracular white pig. With dreams of becoming a great hero, over the course of the series, his character matures as he is drawn into the war against Arawn Death-Lord.

During his journey, he befriends Princess Eilonwy, a young girl his age, Fflewddur Fflam, a wandering bard and minor king, Gurgi, a wild creature between animal and man, and the dwarf Doli. Upon the conclusion of the series, Taran is crowned High King of Prydain and marries Eilonwy.

== Fictional biography ==
=== Background and characteristics ===
Taran is a young man in late adolescence, who lives with the enchanter Dallben and the aged warrior Coll. He is charged with taking care of the oracular pig Hen Wen and throughout the series is known under the title of Assistant Pig-Keeper.

Taran's age is never given at any time in the series, though at the outset he seems to be approximately fourteen years old. The readers are also never given any indication as to the character's appearance, and as a result, he has been depicted in many different ways. In the animated film The Black Cauldron, he is shown as a red-haired, brown-eyed youth who spends a great deal of time staring out of windows and daydreaming; he is voiced by British actor Grant Bardsley.

Taran is headstrong and courageous, though occasionally foolhardy, and harbors an intense desire to prove his worth and heroism through noble acts. Indeed, much of the series centers on Taran's search for his own worth.

=== The Chronicles of Prydain ===
Taran was a foundling discovered by Dallben the Enchanter amongst the slaughter on a battlefield. Dallben brought the baby to be raised and educated at the small hamlet of Caer Dallben, where he would be protected by Dallben, the famed enchanter, and Coll, an aged warrior turned farmer. As Taran grew up he became restless and longed for adventures beyond the borders of Caer Dallben. His time would eventually come when, just after being granted the position of Assistant Pig-Keeper to Hen Wen, Dallben's oracular pig (actually a name Coll conceived for the job that had been Taran's for some time), the animal escapes her enclosure. Taran follows her and soon finds himself caught up in an epic struggle that will determine the fate of the land of Prydain.

During his adventures he is befriended by the great Prince Gwydion. When the two are captured by the Enchantress Queen Achren, he meets the Princess Eilonwy. With his help, she frees the ancient, magical sword Dyrnwyn from Achren's clutches, an event that will set in motion the war that could bring about the defeat of Arawn, the Death Lord. Taran is assisted in his quest by many friends, including the self-styled Bard Fflewddur Fflam, the shaggy creature Gurgi, and the stalwart dwarf warrior Doli.

Taran's adventures see him leading armies against the Death Lord, Arawn, meeting a trio of witches, attempting to rescue the kidnapped Eilonwy and finally struggling to come to terms with his own past. Eventually he proves his worth, both as a soldier and a man, and helps to defeat Arawn in pitched battle. After Arawn is defeated, most of Taran's companions decided to journey to the Summer Country where they will be granted eternal youth and happiness. Taran, however, makes the difficult decision to stay in Prydain and rebuild the land that was nearly destroyed by Arawn. Dallben warns Taran that he is giving up eternal happiness for a difficult life that might end without anyone ever acknowledging his efforts, but Taran remains steadfast in his decision. It is only after this that Dallben and Gwydion reveal to him that he has earned not only his honor, but also the title of High King of Prydain. Taran, it turns out, has fulfilled an old prophecy from The Book of Three which stated that someone of unknown birth would eventually rise up, defeat a serpent (Arawn, Death-Lord of Annuvin implied), choose a kingdom of sorrow over a kingdom of happiness, and thereby prove his worth as the next High King. Taran, the only survivor of a long-past battle, has done just that. With Eilonwy as his Queen, Taran assumes the throne and rules with justice and wisdom until the end of his days.

An aspect of all the trials that Taran must overcome in his life until he becomes High King is that he always has to "let something go". In the first book he must quit his own quest to save Hen Wen so that he can alert the Sons of Don; in the second book he has to let go of a magical brooch that granted him "wisdom" to have the Black Cauldron, and later he has to let go the honor of capturing the Black Cauldron so that he can transport it to be destroyed. In the third book he must give up Eilonwy, although only temporarily while she is fostered in a foreign royal court, and in the fourth book, he gives up his quest to learn of his parentage. In the last book there is a moment he has to choose between completing his mission and his search for Eilonwy; and there is his momentous decision of giving up eternal life in order to rebuild Prydain.

== Adaptations ==
=== Disney version ===
Taran
- First appearance: The Black Cauldron (film) (1985)
- Voiced by: Grant Bardsley

Taran (voiced by Grant Bardsley) appears in the 1985 Disney animated film The Black Cauldron, a loose adaptation of books one and two. This version of the character also appears in the film's video game, as well in the video game Disney Magic Kingdoms as a playable character.

== Sources ==
- Hicks, Jeff (2011). "Loosely Based: The Problems of Adaptation in Disney's The Black Cauldron". In Becker, Audrey L.; Noone, Kristin; Palumbo, Donald E. (eds.). Welsh Mythology and Folklore in Popular Culture: Essays on Adaptations in Literature, Film, Television and Digital Media. Critical Explorations in Science Fiction and Fantasy. Vol. 33. McFarland. ISBN 978-0786461707 – via Google Books.
- Butchart, Liam (2019). ""What Man Am I?" The Hero's Journey, the Beginning of Individuation, and Taran Wanderer". Mythlore: A Journal of J.R.R. Tolkien, C.S. Lewis, Charles Williams, and Mythopoeic Literature. 38 (1). Southwestern Oklahoma State University. ISSN 0146-9339.
- Carr, Marion (1971). Classic Hero in a New Mythology. Vol. 37. The Horn Book Magazine. pp. 508–13.
- Davis, Amy M. (2014). "Disney Films 1967-1988: The "Middle" Era". Handsome Heroes & Vile Villains: Men in Disney's Feature Animation. Indiana University Press. ISBN 978-0-861-96907-4 – via Google Books.
- Filmer-Davies, Kath (1996). "The Place of the Pig-Keeper". Fantasy Fiction and Welsh Myth: Tales of Belonging. Palgrave Macmillan. ISBN 978-0-333-65029-5 – via Google Books.
- Fisher, Margery (1975). Who's who in Children's Books: A Treasury of the Familiar Characters of Childhood. Holt, Rinehart and Winston. ISBN 978-0030150913.
- Nelson, Claudia; Morris, Rebecca, eds. (2014). "Lloyd Alexander's Chronicles of Prydain: Imaging the American Child through a British Lens". Representing Children in Chinese and U.S. Children's Literature. Studies in Childhood, 1700 to the Present. Routledge. ISBN 978-1472424211 – via Google Books.
- Patterson, Nancy-Lou; Urrutia, Benjamin (1986). "Reviews". Mythlore: A Journal of J.R.R. Tolkien, C.S. Lewis, Charles Williams, and Mythopoeic Literature. 4. 12 (46). Southwestern Oklahoma State University. ISSN 0146-9339.
- Torrance, E. Paul (1971). "Identity: The gifted child's major problem". Gifted Child Quarterly. 15 (3). 147-155: 147–155. doi:10.1177/001698627101500301. S2CID 146444219.
- White, Donna R. (1998). "Chronicles of Prydain". A Century of Welsh Myth in Children's Literature. Greenwood Press. ISBN 0-313-30570-6 – via Google Books.
- White, Donna R. (1991). The Mabinogi in Children's Literature: Welsh Legends in English-language Children's Books. University of Minnesota.
