= Evaline Ness =

American illustrator and writer (1911–1986)

- Born: Evaline Michelow; April 24, 1911; Union City, Ohio, U.S.
- Died: August 12, 1986 (aged 75); Kingston, New York, U.S.
- Occupations: Illustrator; writer
- Writing career
- Period: 1954–1983; 1930s–1950s (fashion)
- Genres: Children's picture books; young adult fiction; fashion
- Notable works: Sam, Bangs and Moonshine and three Caldecott Medal runners-up; The Chronicles of Prydain (covers and maps)
- Notable awards: Caldecott Medal; 1967

Evaline Ness (née Michelow; April 24, 1911 – August 12, 1986) was an American commercial artist, illustrator, and author of children's books. She illustrated more than thirty books for young readers and wrote several of her own. She used a great variety of artistic media and methods.

As an illustrator of picture books she was one of three Caldecott Medal runners-up each year from 1964 to 1966 and she won the 1967 Medal for Sam, Bangs and Moonshine, which she also wrote. In 1972 she was the U.S. nominee for the biennial, international Hans Christian Andersen Award for children's illustrators.

== Life ==
Ness was born Evaline Michelow in Union City, Ohio and grew up in Pontiac, Michigan. As a child she illustrated her older sister's stories with collages cut from magazine pictures. She studied at Ball State Teachers College 1931–32 to become a librarian, then at Chicago Art Institute 1933–35 to become a fashion illustrator. For a while she was also a fashion model.

Evaline adopted and retained the name of her second husband Eliot Ness, married 1939 to 1945. She had previously married one McAndrew and she married engineer Arnold A. Bayard in 1959, who survived her.

In 1938 Eliot Ness was already famous as a former United States Treasury agent. (As leader of a legendary team nicknamed "The Untouchables" he had worked to enforce Prohibition in Chicago, Illinois.) Now he was the recently divorced Safety Director for the city of Cleveland, Ohio, with a new team of Untouchables (men who cannot be bribed). By April 1939, when he cleaned up the Mayfield Road Gang, Ness and Evaline McAndrew were an item in Cleveland, where she was a fashion illustrator at Higbee's department store. After their marriage (October 14), they remained an item because she would "keep house—and her job", and because they went out with a female bodyguard for Evaline. A friend of the couple once said that "Evaline liked being Eliot's wife when he was a famous and influential public official. She liked his prominence and power and fame. He loved her, no question about that. He always called her 'Doll'." After a 1942 scandal ruined his standing in Cleveland, the Nesses moved to Washington late that year. (Note: Eliot Ness pursued his personal battle against venereal disease in the Department of Social Protection, focusing on prostitution in communities surrounding military bases. Sources: Laurence Bergreen; Encyclopedia of Cleveland History.) Evaline studied at the Corcoran College of Art and Design 1943–45 and taught art classes for children there.

Evaline and Ness divorced in 1945. After this, she moved to New York City and worked 1946 to 1949 at Saks Fifth Avenue as a fashion illustrator. Around 1950 she traveled to Europe and Asia, concluding in Italy, where she spent 18 months sketching until her money ran out. In Rome she studied at Accademia de Belle Arti 1951–52. Back in the United States, Ness found no work in San Francisco, so returned to New York and "assignments doing fashion, advertising and editorial art". At some point she studied with the Art Students League and she taught art to children at Parsons The New School for Design 1959–60.

Her first illustrations for publication in a children's book were for Story of Ophelia by Mary J. Gibbons (Doubleday, April 1954) —using "charcoal, crayon, ink, pencil and tempera". Kirkus Reviews said, "Evaline Ness' color pictures of elongated, human-looking animals express in their flimsiness, a searching quality." Although successful as a commercial artist, she focused on children's literature beginning with her second illustrated book, The Bridge by Charlton Ogburn (Houghton Mifflin, 1957). Saturday Review recommended it for teenagers and concluded, "Unusual drawings printed in sea green, gray, and black convey the same moods as the story and add a decorative note to a book which is beautiful in every way." From 1958 to 1963 she illustrated about a dozen books and produced cover art for others including Island of the Blue Dolphins by Scott O'Dell (1960).

According to Charles Bayless at the bookshop Through the Magic Door, the 1960s were a time of experiment in illustration for children, with some fashion for "drawings with sharp, angular figures, muted colors and representational or cartoon-like styles", which helped Ness to thrive. The first story she both wrote and illustrated was Josefina February (Scribners, 1963), after visiting Haiti for one year. It was set in Haiti, about a girl's search for a lost burro, with a series of woodcuts. Or her first was A Gift for Sula Sula (Scribners, 1963).

Her three Caldecott Honor Books were published 1963 to 1965: All in the Morning Early by Sorche Nic Leodhas, A Pocketful of Cricket by Rebecca Caudill, and Tom Tit Tot: An English Folk Tale retold by Virginia Haviland. She herself wrote the Caldecott-winning Sam, Bangs and Moonshine (1966), about a fisherman's daughter, illustrated with line and wash drawings. "Sam" (Samantha) tells lies or "moonshine", which finally endanger her pet cat "Bangs" and a neighbor boy; she learns responsibility for what she says. About this time, Ness did the colorful front and back covers and the maps of Prydain for the popular series by Lloyd Alexander, The Chronicles of Prydain (1964 to 1968). Meanwhile, there were two Prydain picture books that she illustrated.

Late in life Ness experimented with cut-out coloring books such as Four Rooms From The Metropolitan Museum of Art To Cut Out and Color (1977). Her last illustrated book was The Hand-Me-Down Doll by Steven Kroll (1983) —using pencil, watercolor, ink and charcoal.

Ness lived in New York at least to 1967. She died 1986 in Kingston, New York, then a resident of Palm Beach, Florida. According to Eliot Ness's biographer, Evaline was cremated and her ashes unceremoniously disposed of by her alienated third husband, an engineer named Arnold Bayard. Evaline was buried in Snow Cemetery located in Truro, Barnstable County Massachusetts.

== Legacy ==
"Evaline Ness Papers" at the University of Minnesota is a collection of "manuscript and illustrative material" for twenty books published 1954 to 1983. According to that archive,

[Ness] was noted for her ability to work in a variety of media and her innovative and unique illustrations that interweaved text and pictures to create a story that captured a young child's attention and imagination. This talent is especially evident in her own written works with their girl protagonists and subtle stories that have a backdrop of 'feminism' and present 'real' characters learning about all of life's pleasures, problems, and pains.

"Evaline Ness Papers" at the Free Library of Philadelphia is a collection of work "for the books Coll and His White Pig, The Truthful Harp, The Black Cauldron, The Castle of Llyr, Taran Wanderer, The High King, and Old Mother Hubbard and Her Dog. According to that archive,

This collection contains dummies, sketches, paste-ups, preliminary and finished artwork, and color separations for eight books illustrated by Evaline Ness.

"Evaline Ness Papers" at the University of Southern Mississippi is two boxes of material from her illustrations of four stories written by other authors, published 1965 to 1975. According to that archive,

Because printer's ink is flat, Ness' constant concern was how to get texture into that flatness. The primary challenge in illustrating children's books, she believed, was how to maintain freedom within limitation. Some of the techniques she has used to combat these limitations include woodcut, serigraphy, rubber-roller technique, ink splattering, and sometimes spitting.
