= Margot Zemach =

American children's illustrator and writer (1931 – 1989)

- Born: November 30, 1931; Los Angeles, California, U.S.
- Died: May 21, 1989 (aged 57); Berkeley, California, U.S.
- Education: Los Angeles County Art Institute; Academy of Fine Arts Vienna
- Occupations: Children's writer; Illustrator
- Spouse: Harvey Fischtrom
- Children: 4, including Kaethe Zemach
- Writing career
- Genre: Children's literature
- Notable work: Duffy and the Devil
- Notable awards: Caldecott Medal (1974)

Margot Zemach (November 30, 1931 – May 21, 1989) was an American illustrator of more than forty children's books, some of which she also wrote. Many were adaptations of folk tales from around the world, especially Yiddish and other Eastern European stories. She and her husband Harvey Fischtrom, writing as Harve Zemach, collaborated on several picture books including Duffy and the Devil for which she won the 1974 Caldecott Medal.

== Life ==
Margot Zemach was born in Los Angeles. Her mother was an actress and her step-father was a director, so she grew up surrounded by the theater. When she was growing up there during the Great Depression, she used drawing to make people laugh but she never had enough paper. She studied at the Los Angeles County Art Institute and, on a Fulbright Scholarship in 1955–1956, at the Academy of Fine Arts Vienna in Austria.

In 1957, Zemach married Harvey Fischtrom (1933–1974). They had four daughters, including Kaethe Zemach who is another writer and illustrator of children's books. Margot Zemach died in Berkeley, California on May 21, 1989, of amyotrophic lateral sclerosis, or Lou Gehrig's disease.

== Career ==
Zemach began her career when Fischtrom urged her to do children's books. Houghton Mifflin published their first collaboration in 1959, Small boy is listening, based on their experiences in Vienna. She did the illustrations and he did the text under the pseudonym Harve Zemach. Next year Little, Brown published her work with another writer, Take a Giant Step by Hannelore Hahn.

The husband-and-wife team produced 13 books together, often simply as "Harvey & Margot Zemach" although he wrote and she illustrated. For Duffy and the Devil: a Cornish tale (1973), Margot won the Caldecott Medal from the American Library Association recognizing the year's best-illustrated U.S. children's picture book. The book was also a finalist for the annual National Book Award, Children's Literature and it was named to the Lewis Carroll Shelf Award list in 1976. Zemach was one of the Caldecott runners-up in 1970 for The Judge: An Untrue Tale, written by Harve, and in 1978 for It Could Always Be Worse: A Yiddish Folk Tale, which she retold.

Kaethe Zemach's first publication was her only collaboration with her parents, published the year after her father died. The Princess and Froggie (Farrar, Straus and Giroux, 1975) was a collection of stories written by Harve and Kaethe, illustrated by Margot.

For her contribution as a children's illustrator, Zemach was 1980 and 1988 U.S. nominee for the biennial, international Hans Christian Andersen Award, the highest international recognition for creators of children's books.

A manuscript by Margot for a picture book about sibling rivalry, based on her children, was illustrated by Kaethe and published by Arthur A. Levine Books in 2005, Eating up Gladys.

== Selected works ==
=== As writer and illustrator ===
- 1963, The Three Sillies
- 1976, It Could always be Worse: A Yiddish Folk Tale
- 1976, Hush, Little Baby, a traditional lullaby
- 1977, To Hilda for Helping
- 1983, The Little Red Hen: An Old Story
- 1982, Jake and Honeybunch go to Heaven
- 1986, The Three Wishes: An Old Story
- 1988, The Three Little Pigs: An Old Story
- 2001, Some from the Moon, Some from the Sun: Poems and Songs for Everyone, traditional poems and songs

=== Written by Harve Zemach ===
Margot Zemach illustrated picture books written by her husband as Harve Zemach. At least some book covers credited them simply as "Harve & Margot Zemach".

- 1959, Small Boy is Listening (Houghton Mifflin)
- 1961, A Hat with a Rose
- 1964, Nail Soup: A Swedish Folk Tale
- 1965, Salt: A Russian Tale
- 1965, The Tricks of Master Dabble
- 1966, Mommy, Buy Me a China Doll: Adapted From an Ozark Children's Song
- 1966, The Speckled Hen: A Russian Nursery Rhyme
- 1967, Too Much Nose: An Italian Tale
- 1969, The Judge: An Untrue Tale
- 1970, Awake and Dreaming
- 1971, A Penny A Look: An Old Story
- 1973, Duffy and the Devil (a Cornish tale)
- 1975, The Princess and Froggie, stories by Harve Zemach and Kaethe Zemach

=== As illustrator with other writers ===
- 1960, Take a Giant Step, Hannelore Hahn (Little, Brown and Company)
- 1967, Mazel and Shlimazel, or The Milk of a Lioness, Isaac Bashevis Singer
- 1968, When Shlemiel Went to Warsaw and Other Stories, by Issac Bashevis Singer
- 1971, Alone in the Wild Forest, by Issac Bashevis Singer
- 1972, Simon Boom Gives a Wedding, by Yuri Suhl
- 1973, The Foundling and Other Tales of Prydain by Lloyd Alexander (first ed. only)
- 1976, Naftali the Storyteller and his Horse, Sus: And Other Stories, by Issac Bashevis Singer
- 1982, The Cat's Elbow and Other Secret Languages, by Alvin Schwartz
- 1985, The Sign in Mendel's Window, by Mildred Phillips
- 1987, The Two Foolish Cats: Suggested by a Japanese Folktale, by Yoshiko Uchida
- 1988, The Chinese Mirror, by Mirra Ginsburg
- 1988, Sing a Song of Popcorn: Every Child's Book of Poems, by Beatrice Schenk de Regniers
- 1989, All God's Critters got a Place in the Choir, by Bill Staines

=== As writer only ===
- 2005, Eating Up Gladys, illustrated by Kaethe Zemach
