= Nancy-Lou Patterson =

Canadian artist, writer, and curator (1929–2018)

- Born: September 5, 1929; Worcester, Massachusetts
- Died: October 15, 2018 (aged 89); Kitchener, Ontario
- Education: University of Washington
- Partner: E Palmer Patterson II

Nancy-Lou Patterson D.Litt. (September 5, 1929 – October 15, 2018) was a Canadian artist, writer and curator. Known for her writing and artistic work related to topics ranging from folklore and fantasy to liturgical design and Indigenous art, she was responsible for the founding of the Department of Fine Arts at the University of Waterloo.

== Early life and education ==
Patterson was born September 5, 1929, in Worcester, Massachusetts. Her parents, originally from Seattle, Washington, were academics and the family lived in various parts of the northern United States, with Patterson spending much of her childhood in Illinois. The family returned to Seattle at the start of World War II where she attended high school and graduated from the University of Washington with a Bachelor of Fine Arts in 1951.

== Career ==
Following graduation from the University of Washington, Patterson spent two years teaching at the University of Kansas and as a scientific illustrative for the Smithsonian before returning to Seattle to work as a lecturer at the Seattle University.

In 1962 Patterson moved to Waterloo, Ontario, with her husband E Palmer Patterson II, of New Orleans, where he had accepted a position at the University of Waterloo. Following the move, Patterson began teaching fine art and art history courses at Renison College prior to accepting a position as Director of Art and Curator at the University of Waterloo Art Gallery in 1964. Her involvement in art initiatives on campus led to the founding of the Fine Arts Group in 1968. The group evolved into the Department of Fine Arts, for which she served as Department Chair twice (1968–1974, 1979–1982). Initially offering general and honour degrees in studio art, art history and film studies, the department grew to introduce a Master of Fine Arts program in 1993.

Patterson retired from the University of Waterloo in 1992. Within a year she was named Distinguished Professor Emerita and received an honorary doctor of letters from Wilfrid Laurier University. An active supporter of local art initiatives Patterson served as folk artist-in-residence at Schneider Haus in 1999.

== Artistic themes and writing ==
During the 1950s, prior to arriving in Waterloo, Patterson found inspiration in liturgical themes situating her artistic practice within a belief that the worship of God is both a physical and spiritual endeavor. Over the course of her career she produced a number of notable works informed by an understanding of art as a vehicle for aiding spiritual worship. In addition to a mural created for an Anglican Church in Kansas, Patterson was commissioned to produce a number of liturgical pieces. She designed a series of stained glass windows at a variety of institutions within the Region of Waterloo including those at University of Waterloo's Conrad Grebel Chapel (1964), the Beth Jacob Synagogue and the Pioneer Park branch of the Kitchener Public Library. She also created 27-foot wall hanging for use by Kitchener's St. Peter's Lutheran Church. Beyond her commissions, Patterson created and later donated a wealth of decorative art ranging from quilted banners to metalwork for use at the Church of St. Columba in Waterloo, where she herself worshiped.

Patterson developed an interest in folk art shortly after the family relocated to Waterloo due to what she characterized as "a rich heritage of Pennsylvania Dutch and Mennonite handicrafts in the area." On the weekends the family would frequent community auctions where she acquired quilts, embroidered samplers and stoneware. She was equally interested in mythopoeic art and literature writing extensively about of authors representative of the genre including C.S. Lewis, J.R.R. Tolkien, George MacDonald and Dorothy L. Sayers. She was an active Mythlore contributor, reviewing more than 200 books for the publication, in addition to serving as review editor from 1981-1998, and sitting on the journal's editorial board between 1989-1998.

Another of Patterson's areas of interest was Indigenous art, which she both published and taught about over the course of her career. Former student and art educator Linda Carson remembered Patterson's courses as the first to highlight Indigenous artists, using and referring to First Nations communities by name, rather than strictly focusing on European artists.

In addition to a number of scholarly publications, Patterson authored several young adult novels including a series of books focused on the Salisbury family.

== Death and legacy ==
Patterson died in Kitchener on October 15, 2018. The final years of her life were spent in a long-term care facility following a diagnosis of Alzheimer's disease in the early 2000s. Her impact on the local art community was widely recognized through a variety of honours and awards. She was named Oktoberfest's first Woman of the Year in 1985, was given a K-W Arts Lifetime Achievement Award in 1998 and was inducted into the Waterloo Region Hall of Fame in 2004.

== Select bibliography ==
- Canadian native art; arts and crafts of Canadian Indians and Eskimos. Collier-Macmillan Canada. 1973. ISBN 0029756103.
- Apple staff and silver crown : a fairy tale. Porcupine's Quill. 1985. ISBN 9780889840751.
- Iroquoians of the eastern woodlands. Grolier. 1985. ISBN 9780717218592. (with E Palmer Patterson)
- The painted hallway. Porcupine's Quill. 1992. p. 205. ISBN 9780889841420.
- Barricade summer. Brucedale Press. 1996. ISBN 9780969871675.
