= List of awards and nominations received by Mohammad Mohammadian =

Mohammad Mohammadian awards and nominations
Awards and nominations
Award	Wins	Nominations

Totals (Note: Certain award groups do not simply award one winner. They acknowledge several different recipients, have runners-up, and have third place. Since this is a specific recognition and is different from losing an award, runner-up mentions are considered wins in this award tally. For simplification and to avoid errors, each award in this list has been presumed to have had a prior nomination.)
- Wins: 8
- Nominations: 27

Mohammad Mohammadian is an Iranian film director, screenwriter, photographer and producer. He became interested in cinema in his teenage years and started his filmmaking education with the Iranian grandmaster of cinema Abbas Kiarostami whose cinematic style has been an influence.

== Awards and nominations ==
Year	Nominated work	Festival	Country	Awards	Result
2016	The Endless River	Idyllwild International Festival of Cinema	United States	Best Narrative Film	Nominated
2016	Only Five Minutes	Solidando Film Festival	Italy	Best Experimental Film	Nominated
2017	Only Five Minutes	Brooklyn Film Festival Notes: Canadian Screen Awards Qualifying	United States	Best Experimental Film	Nominated
2017	The Endless River	Wine Country Film Festival	United States	Courage in Cinema	Won
2017	The Endless River	Hobnobben Film Festival	United States	Best Fiction Film	Nominated
2017	The Endless River	Arlington International Film Festival	United States	Best Fiction Film	Nominated
2017	The Endless River	Phenicien International Film Festival	France	Best Fiction Film	Nominated
2017	Only Five Minutes	Cape Cod Festival of Arab & Middle Eastern Cinema	United States	Best Narrative Film	Nominated
2017	The Endless River	Colortape International Film Festival	Australia	Best Narrative Film	Nominated
2017	The Endless River	3 Minute Film Festival	United States	Best Fiction Film	Won
2017	The Endless River	First Friday Film Festival Kansas City	United States	Best Narrative Film	Nominated
2017	The Endless River	The Nassau Film Festival	United States	Best Fiction Film	Nominated
2017	The Endless River	Wolves Independent International Film Festival	Lithuania	Best Narrative Film	Nominated
2017	The Endless River	Green Mountain Film Festival	United States	Best Fiction Film	Won
2017	The Endless River	Hell Chess Festival	Spain	Best Narrative Film	Nominated
2017	The Endless River	Rainier Independent Film Festival	United States	Best Fiction Film	Nominated
2017	Only Five Minutes	Manchester International Short Film Festival	United Kingdom	Best Experimental Film	Nominated
2017	The Endless River	Vero Beach Wine & Film Festival	United States	Best Fiction Film	Nominated
2017	The Endless River	Riverside International Film Festival	United States	Best Fiction Film	Won
2017	Only Five Minutes	Life Art Media Festival	Greece	Best Experimental Film	Nominated
2017	Only Five Minutes	Havana International Improv Fest	United States	Best Experimental Film	Nominated
2017	Only Five Minutes	The Earth Day Film Festival	United States	Best Experimental Film	Nominated
2017	Only Five Minutes	Uhvati Film Festival	Serbia	Best Disability Film	Nominated
2017	Only Five Minutes	Prince of Prestige Academy Award	United States	Best Experimental Film	Nominated
2017	Only Five Minutes	Wine Country Film Festival	United States	Courage in Cinema	Won
2018	Only Five Minutes	Entr'2 Marches International Film Festival	France	Best Disability Film	Nominated
2019	I Have Two Loves	Seoul International Cartoon and Animation Festival	South Korea	Best Video Animation	Nominated
2019	I Have Two Loves	Napoli Film Festival	Italy	Best Video Art	Nominated
2021	Life	Slamdance Film Festival Notes: Academy Awards ® Qualifying; BAFTA Qualifying; Canadian Screen Awards Qualifying	United States	Department of Anarchy	Nominated
2021	Life	Slamdance Film Festival Notes: Academy Awards ® Qualifying; BAFTA Qualifying; Canadian Screen Awards Qualifying	United States	Honorable Mention, George Starks Spirit of Slamdance	Won
2021	Agnès Varda	Indie Shorts Mag Film Festival	United States	Best Documentary Film	Nominated
2021	Agnès Varda	Cannes World Film Festival	France	Best Biographical Film	Won
2021	Agnès Varda	Cannes World Film Festival	France	Best Editing	Won
2021	Agnès Varda	Indiex Film Fest	United States	Best Documentary Film	Nominated
2021	Agnès Varda	Screen ATX	United States	Best Score Film	Nominated
2021	I'm Monica Bellucci	Independent Shorts Awards	United States	Best Experimental Film	Nominated

== See also ==
- Film festival
- Academy of Motion Picture Arts and Sciences
- List of awards and nominations received by Steven Spielberg
- List of awards won by Abbas Kiarostami
