= Chronicles =

Chronicles may refer to:

- Books of Chronicles in the Bible
- Chronicle, chronological histories
- The Chronicles of Narnia, a novel series by C. S. Lewis
- The Chronicles of Prydain, a novel series by Lloyd Alexander.
- Holinshed's Chronicles, the collected works of Raphael Holinshed
- The Idhun Chronicles, a Netflix anime-style series based on the Idhún's Memories book trilogy by Laura Gallego
- Book of Chronicles, an alternate name for the Nuremberg Chronicle of 1493
- Chronicles: Volume One, Bob Dylan's autobiography
- Chronicles (magazine), a conservative magazine from the Charlemagne Institute
- Chronicles (Magic: The Gathering), an expansion set of the Magic: The Gathering trading card game
- Chronicles (2022 TV limited series), an italian western drama TV limited series of 2022.
- Froissart's Chronicles, a prose history of the Hundred Years' War written in the 14th century by Jean Froissart
- Samurai Rabbit: The Usagi Chronicles, an upcoming Netflix CGI-animated series loosely based on the Usagi Yojimbo comics by Stan Sakai

== Albums ==
- Chronicles (Audiomachine album), 2012
- Chronicles (David Arkenstone album), 1993
- Chronicles (Free album), 2006
- Chronicles (Jon and Vangelis album), 1994
- Chronicles (Rush album), 1990
  - Chronicles (video), a compilation of music videos by Rush
- Chronicles (Steve Winwood album), 1987
- Chronicles (The Velvet Underground album), 1991
- The Chronicles (E.S.G. album), 2008

== Films ==
- The English name of the 2004 Ecuadorian thriller film, Crónicas

== See also ==
- Chronicle (disambiguation)
- Crônica, a Portuguese-language genre of short-form writing
