= The Beggar Queen =

1984 novel by Lloyd Alexander

- First edition
- Author: Lloyd Alexander
- Language: English
- Series: Westmark trilogy
- Genre: Fantasy
- Published: 1984 (E. P. Dutton)
- Publication place: United States
- Media type: Print (hardcover & paperback)
- Pages: 235 (first, hardback)
- ISBN: 0-440-90548-6 (first edition, hardback)
- Preceded by: The Kestrel

The Beggar Queen (1984) is a speculative fiction novel by American author Lloyd Alexander. It is the third and last book in the Westmark trilogy. The authoritarian Cabbarus has returned to Westmark and Theo and Queen Mickle, along with their allies, plot a revolution. Upon their victory, Mickle declares a republic and goes into exile with her new husband Theo and their old friends Count Las Bombas and Musket the dwarf.

Lloyd Alexander noted that the book was inspired by several different sources, including the paintings of Francisco Goya and key figures in the French Revolution. As The Beggar Queen was released, publications from Boys' Life to New Directions for Women praised it. It has come under some critique for its heavy subject matter and complex plot, but has also received recognition as a "serious look at revolution and its difficulties and consequences."

== Origins ==
Writing on the origin of the series, Lloyd Alexander noted that many of the characters bore at least some resemblance to historical figures--Louis St Just and the radical Justin, Napoleon Bonaparte and "the gallant and charismatic Florian," Giuseppe Balsamo and Count Las Bombas are a few of the notable pairs. Similarly, Alexander acknowledged that "an awful lot of situations in Westmark" were inspired by his service in World War II. When addressing a 1985 conference of the Children's Literature Association, he specifically noted that "in The Kestrel and The Beggar Queen, I relied upon my own experiences and observations of some forty years ago." He also stated that Marianstat, the capital city of Westmark where most of the novel's action takes place, was directly inspired by his postwar sojourn in Paris. Inspired by Francisco Goya's Los Caprichos, he realized that The Beggar Queen's true protagonists were the everyday citizens of Marianstat who stood up to Cabbarus, writing that "The vital centers of the story had to do with love, loyal friendships, and, above all, hopefulness and possibilities." In an interview, Alexander also commented that the process of writing the trilogy was "a profoundly disturbing and painful emotional experience" and that its content and themes were "very meaningful and very painful" for him to write about. Apparently, this led to the much lighter adventure comedies of the Vesper Holly books.

== Plot summary ==
The peace between the new constitutional order in Westmark and the kingdom of Regia is fragile. Regia's king, Constantine, supports the liberal and representative reforms that Westmark is implementing. Reactionary elites, including his uncle, do not. Constantine's uncle cooperates with other opponents of the new Westmark regime to fund a coup supporting the return of Cabbarus and supply him with mercenaries. Constantine discovers his uncle's plot to assassinate him to stop the reformist movement and sentences him to a firing squad. Meanwhile, Cabbarus, styling himself as the Director, has set sail for Westmark with his troops.

In Westmark, Theo is wrestling with his duties as a consul. His two counterparts, Florian (the erstwhile revolutionary) and Justin (a radical and Theo's rival), prove difficult to coordinate with. The indefinite postponement of his marriage to Mickle, the reigning Queen of Westmark, does not help matters. For her part, Mickle has been seeking a path to transition to a more republican form of government and therefore freedom to marry Theo and rule her life as she pleases. Her research and politicking are interrupted when armed soldiers burst into her room. The ailing Queen Mother and other Mickle loyalists perish as a result of the coup. Theo and the other consuls manage to avoid arrest, with Justin fleeing the capital into the countryside and Florian getting into contact with Theo and Mickle. It is decided that Florian will attempt to solicit aid from Constantine in Regia while Mickle and Theo organize the citizenry in armed urban resistance to Cabbarus and his regime.

Cabbarus's Directorate begins public executions and utilizes agents, such as Theo's would-be assassin Skeit, to surveil the population. Justin makes contact with Theo, Las Bombas, and other leaders of the pro-Mickle faction and insists that the urban resistance begin to fight violently instead of passively smuggling arms and slowing down the occupation. Theo in particular is troubled by this and wishes to avoid reenacting his past as Colonel Kestrel. Mickle warns Theo against trying to impress Justin and then the raids begin. The violence of the resistance is met with reprisals at the gallows and in the streets. As the resistance intensifies, Mickle and Theo receive word that Florian is on his way back with supporters. After Theo informs Justin that Florian is about to return, he is informed that Justin's army is positioning itself for an invasion of the capital city. Justin also demands that Theo recognize his command authority.

While the resistance and revolutionaries are feuding, Cabbarus's government proceeds to shut down independent publications and seize printing presses. In response, anti-Cabbarus publications become more popular than ever. Even the constabulary sways against Cabbarus. When Theo is arrested, the leading anti-Cabbarus writer, a man named Keller, coordinates with Mickle and her coalition to spring him out of prison. As the raid to free Theo commences, the city bursts into an uprising unprompted by either Justin's army or the resistance led by Mickle and Theo. Everyday citizens set the Directorate's gallows ablaze. Barricades rise and the mercenaries and regime loyalists find themselves being fired upon from every angle. Justin's army chooses this as the moment to enter the city and Justin confronts Theo for refusing to cooperate with him. Theo informs Justin that the people have taken it upon themselves to revolt. Mickle and Theo are then seized by the men of Cabbarus while Justin is mortally wounded. Before Justin dies, Theo promises him to support Westmark's transformation into a republic.

As Mickle and Theo are brought before Cabbarus, Skeit (Cabbarus's secret agent) notices that Florian and his army have arrived. Skeit does not inform Cabbarus of this and disputes with the Director about his payment. Cabbarus initially refuses to pay Skeit and then strikes him in the head with a candlestick before bringing Mickle and Theo into his office. He attempts to negotiate Mickle's return to the throne, as well as Theo's marriage to her, in exchange for supporting his rule. Skeit interrupts the Director with a dagger to the heart and then falls dead to the floor. Mickle and Theo escape from the office using the same trapdoor that Cabbarus had used to try to kill her as a child. They are then found and rescued by some of the victorious citizenry.

Most of the resistance's leadership has fallen in the streets fighting, but the survivors have formed a provisional government headed by Count Las Bombas. Mickle, Theo, Las Bombas, Florian, and other leaders meet. Mickle announces that she is abdicating in favor of a republic and declares her official marriage to Theo. Florian warns her that for her safety and the stability of Westmark she must go into exile if she follows through with the abdication. She acknowledges this and plans to travel the world with Theo, Las Bombas, and Musket the dwarf (Las Bombas's loyal attendant). The story ends with Mickle honoring her loyalists and the citizens of Westmark as the four set sail to a new life.

== Reception ==
The Beggar Queen received significant critical attention when it was released. Noted feminist magazine New Directions for Women praised Alexander's "skillful interweaving of several fascinating themes," including censorship, regime change and political revolution. New Directions also lauded the depiction of Queen Mickle as being "Capable of commanding armies in battle but never losing her compassion, Mickle's love for justice remains her overriding moral law." Of course, the periodical recognized the novel wasn't perfect and lamented how Beggar Queen "doesn't quite live up to the first two" entries in the trilogy. Boys' Life was also largely positive, calling Beggar Queen "a historical fantasy" and praised both the novel and the Westmark series for its "interesting characters, plot twists and exciting action." In Best Sellers, Diane C. Donovan wrote that "while casual young adult readers might tire of the political struggles of the protagonists, those interested in issues of political control, social unrest, and the politics and morals of war will find this a thought-provoking story." Karen Stang Hanley, for Booklist, praised the conclusion to the series and wrote that "Considered as a unit, the trilogy has a remarkable depth and symmetry."

More contemporary reviewers have also had much to say about The Beggar Queen. Laura Ingram, in her entry on Alexander for the Dictionary of Literary Biography, found that the ending of Beggar Queen had resonance with The High King's ending inasmuch as both end on terms where "people must...rule themselves." She also complimented Beggar Queen's "neat and satisfying climax" of the Westmark trilogy. Reactor's Mari Ness critiqued the book, saying that "it’s dense, it keeps crisscrossing here and there, it has far too many subplots, and a very high and fairly depressing death count." Ness did, however, give the book recognition for its "serious look at revolution and its difficulties and consequences" and willingness to give "children books that they can think about."
