= The Last Beautiful Thing =

2025 film by Luca Luongo

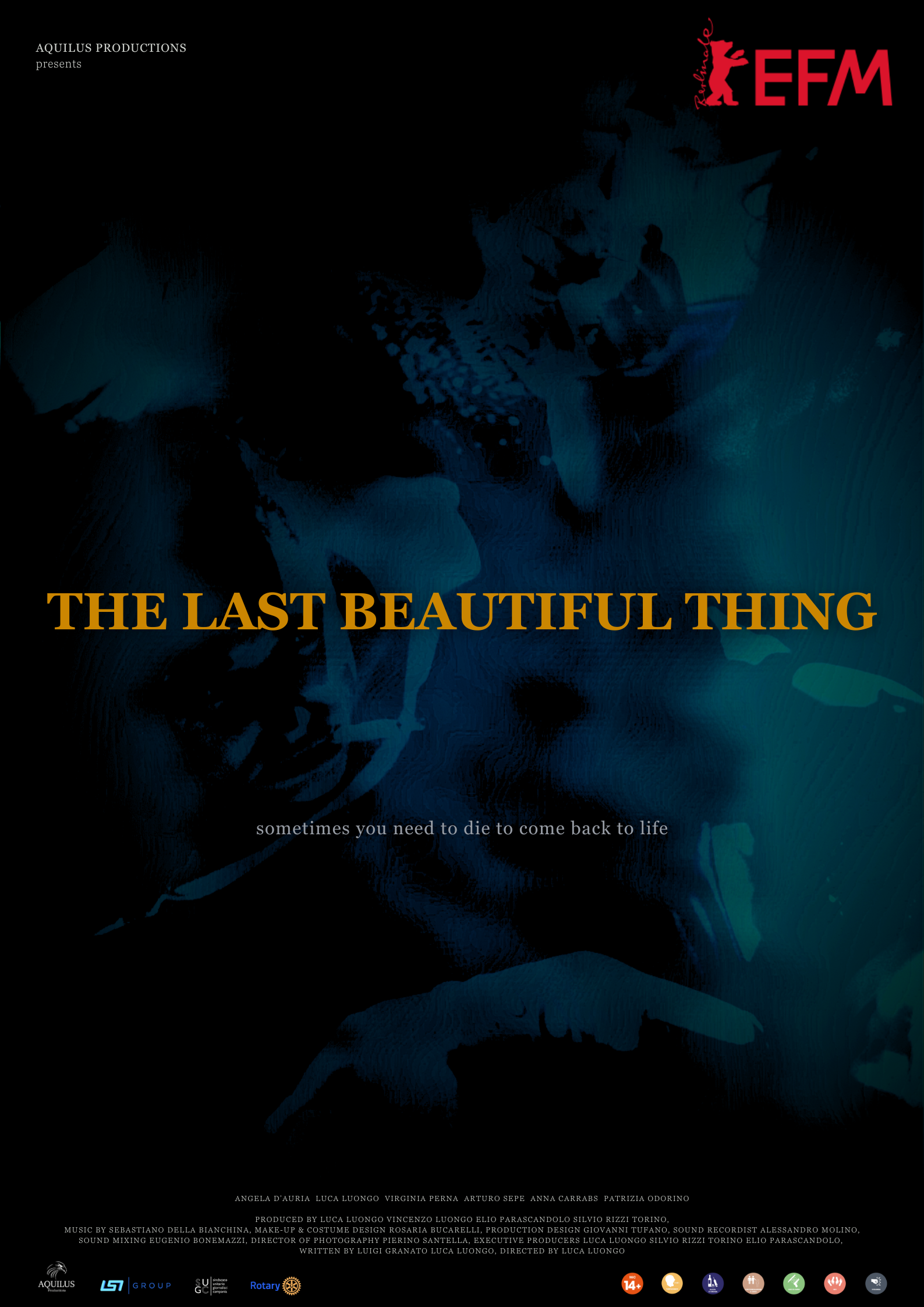
- Theatrical release poster
- Directed by: Luca Luongo
- Written by: Luigi Granato; Luca Luongo
- Produced by: Luca Luongo; Vincenzo Luongo; Silvio Rizzi Torino; Elio Parascandolo
- Starring: Angela D'Auria; Luca Luongo; Virginia Perna; Arturo Sepe; Anna Carrabs; Patrizia Odorino
- Cinematography: Pierino Santella
- Music by: Sebastiano Della Bianchina
- Production company: Aquilus Productions
- Distributed by: Aquilus Productions (Italy); Amazon Prime Video (United States and United Kingdom)
- Release dates: 17 February 2025 (Berlin); 21 February 2025 (Italy); 8 April 2026 (United States); 13 May 2026 (United Kingdom)
- Running time: 95 minutes
- Country: Italy
- Language: Italian

The Last Beautiful Thing (Italian: L'ultima cosa bella) is a 2025 drama film co-written and directed by Luca Luongo. It premiered at the 75th Berlin International Film Festival where it was screened out of competition for the EFM section. It was selected for the 42nd Indipendent Spirit Awards.

== Plot ==
The young Adele lives among the excesses of the nightlife of Naples. She is convinced that her life can improve by conquering Renzo, the PR of the nightclub where she works. But the meeting with the cryptic Federico will give her the chance to discover the true beauty.

== Cast ==
- Angela D'Auria as Adele
- Luca Luongo as Federico
- Virginia Perna as Flavia
- Arturo Sepe as Renzo
- Anna Carrabs as Ghita
- Patrizia Odorino as Candida

== Production ==
The filming of the film began in Naples on August 1, 2023. Several scenes were shot between Portici and other places in the province of Naples.

== Promotion and distribution ==
The teaser trailer of the film was released on October 1, 2024. The film was promoted on Rai 1, Rai News 24 and TV2000 between February and March 2025.

The Last Beautiful Thing had its world premiere at the 75th Berlin International Film Festival, in the out-of-competition section EFM, on February 17. The film was released in Italian cinemas on February 21, 2025, with the national premiere in Rome. It was subsequently limited released on February 24, 2025.

The Last Beautiful Thing was released by Amazon Prime Video in the United States on April 8, 2026, and in the United Kingdom on May 13, 2026.

== Reception ==
=== Critical response ===
Although the film caused division during its presentation at the Berlinale, the Italian critics have usually judged Luongo's first work positively, appreciating its social aspects:

«"The Last Beautiful Thing" is a generational cry [...] At the Berlin Film Festival the film splits the audience in two»

— Domenico Iovane, InDialogo, 17 February 2025

and the directorial line adopted for the narration:

«The young director's film goes beyond denunciation. It is a real slap in the face to today's society, which knows, is aware, but sometimes, keeps away from youthful desperation.»

— Ilaria Cotarella, Il Mattino, 20 March 2025

Overall, the film was described as a courageous, raw, and deeply moving directorial debut, noted for its ability to capture the loneliness and vulnerabilities of today's youth through Adele's story, navigating between the excesses of Neapolitan nightlife and a more intimate search for meaning. Several critics defined the feature film as unconventional and thought-provoking. The director was praised for his courage in addressing youth distress and alienation without resorting to easy moralisms, offering instead an authentic and painful portrayal. Critics appreciated the direction, which successfully conveys a strong sense of realism, as well as the performances of the young protagonists, deemed intense and well-suited to giving voice to the complex psychology of the characters. Reviewers frequently highlighted how the narrative touches deep emotional chords, transforming a story of perdition into a journey of hope and the discovery of hidden beauty in small things. The film was occasionally described as an intense and necessary cinematic experience, standing out in the Italian independent film landscape for its intellectual honesty and visual power.

=== Accolades ===
List of Accolades
Organizations / Festivals	Category	Recipient(s)	Result
75th Berlin International Film Festival	EFM	Luca Luongo, Vincenzo Luongo, Silvio Rizzi Torino and Elio Parascandolo	Official Selection
2025 New York International Film Awards	Best Picture - Drama	Luca Luongo, Vincenzo Luongo, Silvio Rizzi Torino and Elio Parascandolo	Won
2025 New York International Film Awards	Best Actor	Luca Luongo	Nominated
2025 New York International Film Awards	Best Cinematography	Pierino Santella	Won
2025 Los Angeles Italia Film Festival	Best Picture	Luca Luongo, Vincenzo Luongo, Silvio Rizzi Torino and Elio Parascandolo	Nominated
2025 Capri Hollywood International Film Festival	Best Picture	Luca Luongo, Vincenzo Luongo, Silvio Rizzi Torino and Elio Parascandolo	Nominated
2025 Lift-Off First-Time Filmmaker Sessions	Best Picture	Luca Luongo, Vincenzo Luongo, Silvio Rizzi Torino and Elio Parascandolo	Nominated
2025 Lift-Off First-Time Filmmaker Sessions	Audience Choice Award	Luca Luongo, Vincenzo Luongo, Silvio Rizzi Torino and Elio Parascandolo	Won
2026 New York Lift-Off Film Festival	Best Picture	Luca Luongo, Vincenzo Luongo, Silvio Rizzi Torino and Elio Parascandolo	Nominated
2026 New York Lift-Off Film Festival	Best Leading Actor	Luca Luongo	Nominated
2026 New York Lift-Off Film Festival	Best Directing	Luca Luongo	Nominated
2026 New York Lift-Off Film Festival	Best First-Time Filmmaker	Luca Luongo	Nominated
2026 New York Lift-Off Film Festival	Best Cinematography	Pierino Santella	Nominated
2026 New York Lift-Off Film Festival	Best Production Design	Giovanni Tufano	Nominated
2026 New York Lift-Off Film Festival	Best Editing & Post-Production	Eugenio Bonemazzi, Alberto Moscone, Deniz Yuce, Luca Luongo and Arcangelo Sarnataro	Nominated
2025 Minsk International Film Festival Listapad	Cinema of the Young Best Picture	Luca Luongo, Vincenzo Luongo, Silvio Rizzi Torino and Elio Parascandolo	Nominated
2025 Sweden Film Awards	Best First Feature Film	Luca Luongo	Nominated
2025 Napoli Film Festival	Schermo Napoli DopoFestival	Luca Luongo, Vincenzo Luongo, Silvio Rizzi Torino and Elio Parascandolo	Official Selection
2025 Salerno Film Festival	Audience Choice Award	Luca Luongo, Vincenzo Luongo, Silvio Rizzi Torino and Elio Parascandolo	Nominated
2025 Ischia Global Film & Music Festival	Best Picture	Luca Luongo, Vincenzo Luongo, Silvio Rizzi Torino and Elio Parascandolo	Nominated
2025 Ferrara Film Festival	Premiere Autore Best Picture	Luca Luongo, Vincenzo Luongo, Silvio Rizzi Torino and Elio Parascandolo	Nominated
2025 Villammare Film Festival	Best Picture	Luca Luongo, Vincenzo Luongo, Silvio Rizzi Torino and Elio Parascandolo	Nominated
2025 Villammare Film Festival	Best Directing	Luca Luongo	Nominated
2025 Villammare Film Festival	Best Original Screenplay	Luigi Granato and Luca Luongo	Nominated
2025 Villammare Film Festival	Best Original Soundtrack	Sebastiano Della Bianchina	Nominated
2025 Benevento Social Film Festival Artelesia	Best Picture	Luca Luongo, Vincenzo Luongo, Silvio Rizzi Torino and Elio Parascandolo	Nominated
2025 Cefalù Film Festival	Honorable Mention	Luca Luongo, Vincenzo Luongo, Silvio Rizzi Torino and Elio Parascandolo	Won
2026 Cimitile Award	Best Screenplay	Luigi Granato and Luca Luongo	Won
2026 Cimitile Award	Honorable Award for Acting	Arturo Sepe	Won
2026 Atena Nike Award	Best Original Soundtrack	Sebastiano Della Bianchina	Nominated
2026 Atena Nike Award	Best Emerging Actress	Angela D'Auria	Nominated
