= Luca Luongo =

Italian actor and film director (born 1996)

- Born: 7 December 1996 (age 29); Naples, Campania, Italy
- Education: Sapienza University of Rome (BA); Catholic University of Milan (MA)
- Occupations: Actor; director; screenplay writer; producer
- Years active: 2017–present

Luca Luongo (born 7 December 1996) is an Italian actor, director, screenplay writer and producer.

== Biography ==
Luongo was born in Naples on 7 December 1996. He graduated in acting from the TeatroArte Academy of Naples in 2015, and earned a degree in Arts and Sciences of Performing Arts from the Sapienza University of Rome in 2019. He then obtained a master's degree in film production from the Catholic University of Milan and studied film directing at the CSC Lab of the Centro Sperimentale di Cinematografia.

After acting in and directing several short films, he directed and starred in the TV miniseries Chronicles, which was released on Prime Video in 2022. In 2023, he portrayed Arsène Lupin in the medium-length film Snowblind, which he also directed, and was once again distributed by Prime Video. He reprised the role of Lupin in the sequel Backfire, set for release in 2025.

In 2025, at the age of 28, he directed and starred in the film The Last Beautiful Thing, which was presented out of competition at the 2025 Berlin Film Festival. Luongo’s debut film achieved great success with both audiences and critics, winning several awards at national and international festivals.

== Filmography ==
Year	Title	Role	Director	Writer	Producer	Notes
2017	Rhymes	XXX	Yes	Yes	Yes	Short-film
2020	Wrong Fires For Right Hopes	Tony	Yes	Yes	Yes	Short-film
2023	Snowblind	Arsène Lupin	Yes	Yes	Yes	Medium-length film
2025	Backfire	Arsène Lupin	No	No	Yes	Short-film
2025	The Last Beautiful Thing	Federico	Yes	Yes	Yes	

== Television ==
Year	Title	Role	Director	Writer	Producer	Distributor
2022	Chronicles	Joe	Yes	Yes	Yes	Prime Video

== Theatre ==
Year	Title	Role	Director	Venue
2018	The Trojan Women	Menelaus	No	La Carrozza d'Oro, Naples
2019	The Imbecile	Luca Fazio	Yes	GTD theatre, Naples
2024	A Midsummer Night's Dream	Nick Bottom	No	La Carrozza d'Oro, Naples
2025	Fear and Misery of the Third Reich	Theo	No	La Carrozza d'Oro, Naples

== Accolades, awards and nominations ==
List of Accolades
Organizations / Festivals	Year	Work	Category	Result	Ref.
Berlin International Film Festival	2025	The Last Beautiful Thing	EFM	Official Selection	
New York International Film Awards	2025	The Last Beautiful Thing	Best Picture - Drama	Won	
New York International Film Awards	2025	The Last Beautiful Thing	Best Actor	Nominated	
Los Angeles Italia Film Festival	2025	The Last Beautiful Thing	Best Picture	Nominated	
Capri Hollywood International Film Festival	2025	The Last Beautiful Thing	Best Picture	Nominated	
Lift-Off First-Time Filmmaker Sessions	2025	The Last Beautiful Thing	Best Picture	Nominated	
Lift-Off First-Time Filmmaker Sessions	2025	The Last Beautiful Thing	Audience Choice Award	Won	
Minsk International Film Festival Listapad	2025	The Last Beautiful Thing	Cinema of the Young Best Picture	Nominated	
Sweden Film Awards	2025	The Last Beautiful Thing	Best First Feature Film	Nominated	
Napoli Film Festival	2025	The Last Beautiful Thing	Schermo Napoli DopoFestival	Official Selection	
Salerno Film Festival	2025	The Last Beautiful Thing	Audience Choice Award	Nominated	
Ischia Global Film & Music Festival	2025	The Last Beautiful Thing	Best Picture	Nominated	
Ferrara Film Festival	2025	The Last Beautiful Thing	Premiere Autore Best Picture	Nominated	
Villammare Film Festival	2025	The Last Beautiful Thing	Best Picture	Nominated	
Villammare Film Festival	2025	The Last Beautiful Thing	Best Director	Nominated	
Villammare Film Festival	2025	The Last Beautiful Thing	Best Original Screenplay	Nominated	
Benevento Social Film Festival Artelesia	2025	The Last Beautiful Thing	Best Picture	Nominated	
Cefalù Film Festival	2025	The Last Beautiful Thing	Honorable Mention	Won	
Accordi@Disaccordi Short Film Festival	2021	Wrong Fires For Right Hopes	Panorama Cinema Campano	Official Selection	
