= Westmark (novel) =

1981 fantasy novel by Lloyd Alexander

- First edition
- Author: Lloyd Alexander
- Language: English
- Series: Westmark trilogy
- Genre: Fantasy
- Publisher: 1981 (E. P. Dutton)
- Publication place: United States
- Media type: Print (hardcover & paperback)
- Pages: 184 (first edition, hardcover)
- ISBN: 0-525-42335-4 (first edition, hard)
- OCLC: 6735668
- LC Class: PZ7.A3774 We 1981
- Followed by: The Kestrel

Westmark (1981) is a speculative fiction novel by Lloyd Alexander. It won the National Book Award for Children's Books in 1982, Alexander's second win (1970). The novel follows Theo, a printer's devil, while he flees from the law after an altercation with the police. He takes up with a charismatic confidence man named Count Las Bombas and a mysterious girl named Mickle. Mickle is eventually unveiled as the rightful heir to the throne, and Theo falls in love with her. The Kestrel continues the story.

Westmark is notable for being one of Alexander's darker works. According to Alexander, it was inspired by the events of the 18th and 19th centuries, as well as by his own experiences as a soldier in World War Two. Westmark, both the book and the trilogy bearing its name, has received some attention critically and academically. Notably, while often classed as fantasy, it involves few, if any, fantastical elements. The novel has instead been considered a meditation on politics, power, and ethical problems.

== Origins ==
Lloyd Alexander, when discussing the novel and the series at large, attributed its inspiration to the atmosphere of pre-Revolutionary France; to figures of the early nineteenth and late eighteenth centuries such as Alessandro Cagliostro, Napoleon Bonaparte; and to the paintings of Francisco Goya. Alexander noted that Westmark was written because of complicated feelings about the world and his personal life. Alexander also observed that the work straddled the line between fantasy and realism, labelling it as "quite different from my others." Like his Chronicles of Prydain, Alexander acknowledged that "an awful lot of situations in Westmark" were inspired by his service in World War II. In an interview, Alexander commented that the process of writing the trilogy was "a profoundly disturbing and painful emotional experience"; he also noted that the content and themes were "very meaningful and very painful" to write about. Apparently this led to the much lighter adventure comedies of the Vesper Holly books.

== Plot summary ==
Map of Westmark by Meryl Rosner

Theo, a printer's apprentice, takes on a rush job from a mysterious dwarf named Musket. The job is to print pamphlets advertising "Doctor Absalom," whose repertoire of quackery is backed up by an enormous payment. Theo and his master quickly begin the work. As they labour, a Royal Inspector and some guards arrive and request the permit for this publication. Because of the speed required for the job, the printers have not yet received the permit. The Royal Inspector and his men begin to dismantle the press. Theo and his master resist. In the struggle, Theo almost kills the Inspector, and the guards shoot his master dead. Urged on by a sympathetic local constable, Theo disappears into the night, looking for Musket and Doctor Absalom.

When he catches up with the duo, Theo discovers that Doctor Absalom is one of many pseudonyms used by the charismatic confidence man Count Las Bombas. Las Bombas conceals Theo's identity from the police. Despite Theo's moral qualms, he joins up with the mountebanks as they travel around the kingdom of Westmark. Their scams include an attempt to defraud a man named Skeit, who manages to outwit Las Bombas. As the trio travels, they encounter Mickle. Mickle is a girl who lives on the street, and she has talents for mimicry and ventriloquism. Theo invents a scheme to use her talents—pretending to summon the spirits of the dead. While this is a lucrative act, Theo dislikes how it plays on the heartstrings of the bereaved. He decides to leave the group.

Meanwhile, the King's Chief Minister, Cabbarus, has been scheming to usurp power. King Augustine has been ailing since the presumed death of his daughter, Augusta. Queen Caroline and the court physician, Doctor Torrens, oppose Cabbarus and urge the king to accept the world as it is; but Cabbarus attempts to have the king adopt him, and he invests in various spiritualists to satisfy the king's appetite for trying to communicate with Augusta. Frustrated, Cabbarus dispatches an assassin to deal with Torrens, and he uses his private intelligence network to try to have himself appointed heir or to induce the abdication of Augustine.

Eventually, Theo runs into a group of young adults led by a man named Florian. These students are political idealists who criticize the power of Cabbarus, and they agitate for liberalism and republicanism. Theo stays with them, and he helps them to mass-produce and distribute leaflets for their cause. One day, Theo hears that Las Bombas, Musket, and Mickle have been imprisoned in a garrison town called Nierkeeping. Florian decides to help Theo and organizes his group for a raid. Doctor Torrens and Keller, a satirist who saved the Doctor's life, meet up with the group just before the attack. The raid quickly turns violent, but it is successful. In the aftermath, Florian argues with Theo and Torrens about his methods and anti-monarchism, but he agrees to shelter Torrens. Theo rejoins Las Bombas, Musket, and Mickle, with whom he has a blossoming relationship. Before travelling very far, the four are arrested by Skeit on orders from Cabbarus.

Mickle's resemblance to the dead Augusta and her mimicry skills, as well as Las Bombas's oracle trick, have attracted Cabbarus's attention. He blackmails the group into performing in front of the entire court, including the king and queen, and using Mickle's voice to persuade them that Cabbarus should be king. Mickle begins to remember events from her childhood and has a nervous breakdown. During the performance, she exposes Cabbarus as having attempted to murder Augusta, and she reveals herself as the lost princess. Cabbarus flees and almost falls from the bell tower, but he is apprehended by Theo. King Augustine and Queen Caroline would like Cabbarus executed, but Theo persuades them to send Cabbarus into exile instead. Torrens returns, reporting that Florian's group has gone into hiding. King Augustine then promotes Torrens to Chief Minister. Troubled by the events and the unrest that he has witnessed, Torrens dispatches Theo to travel around Westmark. Theo and Mickle part reluctantly, Mickle to train for her royal status and Theo to undertake his mission.

== Sequels ==
The name Westmark refers to three things: the country that the story is primarily set in, the trilogy of books, and the first volume of the trilogy. While considered a fantasy, the story is set in a world very similar to the real one. Alexander cited events and personalities from the Age of Enlightenment as among his inspirations. The Encyclopedia of Fantasy refers to the series as "Graustarkian adventures" and compares the setting to its entry on Ruritania. The series follows Theo, a printer's apprentice, and Mickle, a street urchin with secrets, as they lead the country of Westmark through several crises.

=== Trilogy Synopsis ===
Book One is the eponymous Westmark. Theo is on the run from the law; Mickle has amnesia. With the intervention of Count Las Bombas and Musket the dwarf, they become entangled with high politics.

Immediately following Westmark is The Kestrel. Mickle has become Queen of Westmark. The neighboring state of Regia invades Westmark and the professional military largely surrenders. However partisans led by Theo, the Queen, and reformist student groups continue the defense of Westmark.

The Beggar Queen concludes the trilogy. After the war with Regia concludes a military coup brings Cabbarus, an oppressive tyrant, to power in Westmark. Mickle and Theo lead an urban guerilla resistance to the new regime.

== Reception ==
"Lloyd Alexander does not answer questions; he raises them", wrote Jean Fritz for the New York Times Book Review when Westmark was published. Another contemporary review, for the School Library Journal, praised the novel for its "Rich language, excellent characterization, detailed descriptions and a dovetailed plot equal superb craftsmanship." Writing for the Horn Book Magazine, Ethel L. Heins was complimentary, noting that the novel engagingly portrayed "the age-old perplexities of right and wrong, human weakness and decency, the temptation of power, and the often unclear call of conscience." The Journal of Reading's reviewer, M. Jean Greenlaw, referred to it as "an exciting and adventurous story replete with the marvelous facility for language play that Alexander always exhibits." Ruth M. Stein, in Language Arts, called it "A book to hug to one's heart."

Westmark has also been examined academically. In their bio-bibliography of Alexander, fantasy scholars James S. Jacobs and Michael O. Tunnell note that the novel and the series "maintained a feeling similar to fantasy even though nothing in them violated the natural laws of this world." The scholars also highlight that the uniqueness of the series "became Alexander's opportunity to treat some favorite themes with uncompromising honesty: the brutality and senselessness of war, how oppression bruises the gentle spirit, and how even the mildest individual must sometimes fight against an oppressor."

== Awards ==
- 1982 - National Book Award for Children's Books, category Fiction (hardcover).
