= The Kestrel =

1982 fantasy novel by Lloyd Alexander

- First edition
- Author: Lloyd Alexander
- Cover artist: Charles Mikolaycak
- Language: English
- Series: Westmark trilogy
- Genre: Fantasy novel
- Published: 1982 (E. P. Dutton)
- Publication place: United States
- Media type: Print (hardcover & paperback)
- Pages: 244 (first, hard)
- ISBN: 0-525-45110-2 (first edition, hard)
- OCLC: 7877126
- LC Class: PZ7.A3774
- Preceded by: Westmark
- Followed by: The Beggar Queen

The Kestrel (1982) is a speculative fiction novel by Lloyd Alexander and is the second volume of the Westmark series. It follows Theo as he comes to grips with his capacity for violence and Mickle as she discovers her ability to lead during an invasion of their country, Westmark. The Beggar Queen follows this installment.

Like Westmark, The Kestrel owes a significant debt to the people and events of the Enlightenment era, as well as Lloyd Alexander's experiences in the Second World War. Critics were mixed in their reception of the book, with some praising its execution and intensity and others calling it clunky. In 1982, The Kestrel won a Parents' Choice Gold Award.

== Origins ==
When discussing The Kestrel, Lloyd Alexander specifically cited Goya's Los Desastres de la Guerra as a stylistic and thematic influence. He also wrote that his intention was "to show the brutalization of nearly everyone touched by war." Like his Chronicles of Prydain, Alexander acknowledged that "an awful lot of situations in Westmark" were inspired by his service in World War II. When addressing a 1985 conference of the Children's Literature Association, he specifically noted that "in The Kestrel and The Beggar Queen I relied upon my own experiences and observations of some forty years ago." In an interview, Alexander also commented that the process of writing the trilogy was "a profoundly disturbing and painful emotional experience" and that the content and themes were "very meaningful and very painful" for him to write about. Apparently, this led to the much lighter adventure comedies of the Vesper Holly books.

== Plot summary ==
While traveling the kingdom of Westmark, Theo runs into Cabbarus's agent Skeit. Skeit shoots him. Theo is recued by Florian's agents and taken to a safe house. As Theo is convalescing under Florian's care, Westmark is invaded by its neighbor Regia. Led by General Erzcour, the high command of the Westmark military surrenders after a brief resistance. Feeling betrayed, most of the common soldiers fight on with the encouragement of Theo's love interest, Mickle (now Queen Augusta), and her government.

Theo insists upon joining the students and the leaderless troops to conduct irregular operations on the supply lines of the Regian military. He begins to struggle internally over the ethics of his actions. Many friends and people that he feels responsible for die. As the grueling work of reconnaissance, combat, and command takes its toll, Theo begins to become numb. Under the moniker "the Kestrel," he develops a reputation for brutality and effectiveness. When he learns of the nearness of the Regian headquarters, and that they have taken his radical commander Justin captive, he leads a strike on the town.

Meanwhile, Mickle has left the capital city and is leading her soldiers at the front. She recruits Count Las Bombas as her principal military advisor. Under her guidance, the army of Westmark obstructs and harasses the Regian advance. Peasants and commoners rise in support of her defensive actions and torch the homes of the recalcitrant nobility. In response to political turmoil, her chief minister begins to restrict press freedoms and crack down on public defeatism. Recognizing that the political situation has become extremely tricky, and tiring of the war, Mickle and Las Bombas don disguises and infiltrate Regian headquarters.

Reactionary elements of Westmark's aristocracy are collaborating with the Regian invaders and in some cases, such as General Erzcour, have assumed command roles in the Regian military. The King of Regia is the youthful Constantine, who resents the cabal of reactionaries driving the war effort. When Mickle shows up in disguise at the forward headquarters of the Regian army, she manages to gain access to their military elites. She is detained by Erzcour, who recognizes her, but escapes during the confusion of a raid by the Kestrel. Theo, seeing her Regian uniform, shoots her. After Las Bombas identifies Mickle to Theo, the group escapes to the treeline and begins to revive her.

During her recovery, Constantine, who had fled from the Kestrel's troops, stumbles upon them. He and Mickle conduct peace negotiations and agree on a withdrawal of Regian forces. Mickle also approves Florian and Theo's plan to begin the transition to representative democracy through a constitutional monarchy. One of the chief reactionary collaborators is revealed to be Florian's father; recognizing the changing political order, he shoots himself after a conversation with Theo and Florian. Amid all of the upheaval, Theo and Mickle agree to postpone their marriage so that he can participate in the legislature while she reigns as Queen of Westmark.

== Reception ==
Zena Sutherland, a literary critic specializing in children's literature, hailed The Kestrel as "Another smasher" from Alexander. M. Jean Greenlaw said of the book that it was "sure to be an award winner... This thought-provoking novel could stimulate intense discussion." In the School Library Journal, Hazel Rochman compared The Kestrel to Westmark, writing that the sequel had "a more realistic and complex narrative form." Rochman also praised Lloyd Alexander's ability to shift "easily from the brutality to the absurdity of war." Kirkus Reviews found the book "more fossilized than timeless--which is probably fine with Alexander's audience." Booklist's reviewer, Denise M. Wilms, referred to the novel as "less nimble than its predecessor" while still praising it as "brimming" and "colorful." Writing for the New York Times Book Review, Georgess McHargue complained that "the hand of the puppeteer is too much in evidence here," while conceding that The Kestrel and Westmark filled a need in the market for "political novels for young people."The Kestrel was awarded a Parents' Choice Gold Award in "Fall 1982 Fiction."
