= The First Two Lives of Lukas-Kasha =

Children's novel following Lukas-Kasha's magical adventures

- First edition cover
- Author: Lloyd Alexander
- Cover artist: Laszlo Kubinyi
- Language: English
- Genre: Fantasy novel
- Published: 1978 (E.P. Dutton)
- Publication place: United States
- Media type: Print (Hardcover & Paperback)
- Pages: 213
- ISBN: 0-525-29748-0 (first edition, hardcover)
- OCLC: 3516518
- LC Class: PZ7.A3774 Fi 1978

The First Two Lives of Lukas-Kasha is a children's novel written by Lloyd Alexander in 1978. It follows the adventures of a young man named Lukas-Kasha who finds himself in another world after paying a street magician to perform a magic trick.

== Plot summary ==
Kasha spends his days playing pranks on the people of Zara-Petra and doing as little work as possible. After participating in a magic show, he finds himself transported to the strange world of Abadan. Upon his arrival to the royal city of Shirazan, he is proclaimed king. At first, Kasha enjoys being royalty, but soon discovers that there is more to being king than eating good food and enjoying his lavish surroundings. When Kasha attempts to take control of his kingdom's laws and policies, he meets with strong opposition from his Grand Vizier, Shugdad Mirza. Soon Kasha is forced to flee for his life and escapes the palace with the help of a slave girl and a public versifier.

== Settings ==
- Zara-Petra: Kasha's home town and where the story begins.
- Abadan: Kasha's kingdom, where most of the story takes place.
- Shirazan: The royal city of Abadan.
- Bishangar: The territory north of Abadan. It used to be an independent kingdom before it was conquered by a previous King of Abadan.
- Jannat al-Khuld: The main city and former capital of Bishangar.

== Characters ==
=== Main characters ===
- Lukas-Kasha: The hero of the story, a lazy young man turned into a king overnight.
- Nur-Jehan: A Bishangari girl, whom Kasha meets while she is enslaved in the Shirazan palace.
- Kayim: A versifier and friend of Kasha.

=== Other characters ===
- Shugdad Mirza: Grand Vizier of Abadan.
- Locman: Court Astrologer who predicted Lukas-Kasha's arrival.
- Nahdir Aga: Commander of the Abdanian army.
- Osman: A soldier in the Abdanian army.
- Ardashir: The mysterious king of the Bishangaris.
- Namash: A water seller who comes to Kasha's rescue more than once.
- Shir Khan: An infamous bandit.
- Katir: A dishonest horse trader.
- Haki: A young Bishangari boy who acts a Lukas-Kasha's guide.

== Analysis ==
When classifying his works, Alexander described The First Two Lives of Lukas-Kasha as "unquestionably a fantasy", placing it in the same category as Time Cat, The Chronicles of Prydain, and The Remarkable Journey of Prince Jen.

It received the Silver Pencil Award in 1981, and the Austrian Children's Book Award in 1984.
