= Iron Ring (disambiguation) =

The Iron Ring is a symbolic ring worn by Canadian engineers.

Iron R/ring(s) may also refer to:

- The Iron Ring, a 1997 children's novel by Lloyd Alexander
- The Iron Ring (film), a 1917 American drama film directed by George Archainbaud
- Iron Ring (TV series), American mixed martial arts TV series
- Iron rings, physical training equipment
- Iron ring (laboratory), scientific laboratory equipment
- Iron Ring (Wales), a series of fortifications built by Edward I of England

== See also ==
- Bilbao's Iron Ring, Spanish Civil War fortifications
- Iron Ring Clock, clock at McMaster University, Canada
