= Fragrant Orchid: The Story of My Early Life =

1987 autobiography by Yoshiko Yamaguchi

Fragrant Orchid: The Story of My Early Life (李香蘭 私の半生, Ri Kōran: watashi no hansei; Ri Koran: Half my Life) is an autobiography by Yoshiko Yamaguchi (Note: The English edition writes the author's name in Japanese order, Yamaguchi Yoshiko.) and Fujiwara Sakuya. (Note: The surname here is Fujiwara.) It was published in Japanese in 1987, by Shinchosha.

It was translated into English by Chia-ning Chang, published by University of Hawaii Press in 2015.

The title is a reference to Yamaguchi's stage name in Chinese-language film productions, Li Hsiang-lan a.k.a. Ri Kōran.

== Background ==
Chang works at the University of California system as a member of a faculty. Specifically he is at the University of California, Davis.

== Contents ==
Chang wrote the introduction to the English version. Kris Kosaka of The Japan Times wrote that this scholarly influence distinguishes the work "from a normal memoir".

== Release ==
It was published in Mandarin Chinese in 1988 by Liaoning People's Publishing House.

== Adaptations ==
The book was adapted into a theatre production, written by Keita Asari. (Note: The surname here is Asari.) It was performed in 2013 at the Shiki Theatre, by the Shiki Theatre Company, in Tokyo.

== See also ==
- Sayonara, Li Koran
