= Evening Chronicle (disambiguation) =

Evening Chronicle is the name of several newspapers:

- Manchester Evening Chronicle, founded by Sir Edward Hulton in 1897. Later known as Evening Chronicle. Merged into Newcastle Evening Chronicle in 1963
- Newcastle Evening Chronicle, now known as Evening Chronicle, or just The Chronicle, a daily newspaper produced in Newcastle upon Tyne, covering Tyne and Wear, southern Northumberland and northern County Durham
- Oldham Evening Chronicle, now a defunct daily newspaper published each weekday evening serving the Metropolitan Borough of Oldham, in Greater Manchester, England.

== See also ==
- The Sun Chronicle, formerly The Attleboro Sun and the Evening Chronicle, daily newspaper in Attleboro, Massachusetts, United States
- The Chronicle (disambiguation)
