= Chronicle (disambiguation) =

A chronicle is a historical account of facts and events ranged in chronological order.

Chronicle may also refer to:

== Companies ==
- Chronicle (company), a cybersecurity company owned by Alphabet Inc.
- Chronicle Books, a San Francisco-based book publisher, formerly a subsidiary of Chronicle Publishing Company
- Chronicle Publishing Company, a San Francisco-based publishing & media company

== Film and TV ==
- Chronicle (film), a 2012 American film
- Chronicle (American TV program), a 1982–date newsmagazine program
- Chronicle (British TV programme), a 1966–1991 archaeology programme

== Music ==
- Chronicle (Lights & Motion album), a 2015 album by Swedish band Lights & Motion
- Chronicle (Chicago Underground Trio album), a 2007 album by the Chicago Underground Trio
- Chronicle, Vol. 1, a 1976 album by Creedence Clearwater Revival
- Chronicle, Vol. 2, a 1986 album by Creedence Clearwater Revival

== Other uses ==
- Chronicle (ballet), a ballet choreographed by Martha Graham to music by Wallingford Riegger
- Science Fiction Chronicle, later known as Chronicle. an American magazine published from 1978 until 2006
- Chronicle, an unincorporated town in Catawba County, North Carolina

== See also ==
- The Chronicle (disambiguation)
- Chronicles (disambiguation)
- First Chronicle (disambiguation)
- List of chronicles
- Category:Chronicles
- Crônica, Portuguese-language form of short writings about daily topics, published in newspaper or magazine columns
- Crónica (literary genre), Spanish Latin-American literary genre
