= Mohammad Mohammadian =

Iranian filmmaker

- محمد محمدیان
- Born: 22 June 1987; Isfahan, Iran
- Occupations: Filmmaker, photographer
- Years active: 2016–present
- Style: Minimalism
- Website: mohammad-mohammadian.com

Mohammad Mohammadian (Persian: محمد محمدیان; Persian pronunciation: [mohæmˈmæde: mohæmˈmædeiˈɒːn]; born 22 June 1987) is an Iranian film director, screenwriter, photographer and producer. He became interested in cinema in his teenage years, and started his filmmaking education with the Iranian filmmaker Abbas Kiarostami, whose cinematic style has been a great influence on him.

== Early life and background ==
Mohammadian was born in Isfahan. Historically also rendered in English as Ispahan, Spahan, Sepahan, Esfahan or Hispahan, is a major city in Iran, Greater Isfahan Region. He is one of Abbas Kiarostami's students, and his first artistic experience was filmmaking. Mohammadian has been active as an independent filmmaker since 2016, and his cinematic inspiration is Abbas Kiarostami and Italian neorealism.

== Filmography ==
Year	Film	Director	Writer	Producer	Notes
2016	The Endless River	Yes	Yes	Yes	Narrative film
2016	Only Five Minutes	Yes	Yes	Yes	Experimental film
2017	Behind the Scenes	Yes	Yes	Yes	Documentary film
2018	Beware of your tongue	Yes	Yes	Yes	Music video
2019	Katharine Hepburn	Yes	Yes	Yes	Documentary film
2019	I Have Two Loves	Yes	Yes	Yes	Video art
2020	Life	Yes	Yes	Yes	Experimental film
2020	Marilyn Monroe: Photobiography	Yes	Yes	Yes	Documentary film
2020	Agnès Varda	Yes	Yes	Yes	Documentary film
2020	Beautiful Like a Poem	Yes	Yes	Yes	Documentary film
2021	Abbas Kiarostami	Yes	Yes	Yes	Documentary film
2021	Flying	Yes	Yes	Yes	Experimental film
2021	I'm Monica Bellucci	Yes	Yes	Yes	Experimental film
2021	Moments Within Moments	Yes	Yes	Yes	Experimental film
2022	Dubai Is a Diamond	Yes	Yes	Yes	Documentary film
2022	Stop Racism	Yes	Yes	Yes	Experimental film
2022	Stop Racism II	Yes	Yes	Yes	Experimental film
2022	A Real Hero	Yes	Yes	Yes	Documentary film

== Awards and nominations ==
Year	Nominated work	Festival	Country	Awards	Result
2016	The Endless River	Idyllwild International Festival of Cinema	United States	Best Narrative Film	Nominated
2016	Only Five Minutes	Solidando Film Festival	Italy	Best Experimental Film	Nominated
2017	Only Five Minutes	Brooklyn Film Festival	United States	Best Experimental Film	Nominated
2017	The Endless River	Wine Country Film Festival	United States	Courage in Cinema	Won
2017	The Endless River	Hobnobben Film Festival	United States	Best Fiction Film	Nominated
2017	The Endless River	Arlington International Film Festival	United States	Best Fiction Film	Nominated
2017	The Endless River	Phenicien International Film Festival	France	Best Fiction Film	Nominated
2017	Only Five Minutes	Cape Cod Festival of Arab & Middle Eastern Cinema	United States	Best Narrative Film	Nominated
2017	The Endless River	Colortape International Film Festival	Australia	Best Narrative Film	Nominated
2017	The Endless River	3 Minute Film Festival	United States	Best Fiction Film	Won
2017	The Endless River	First Friday Film Festival Kansas City	United States	Best Narrative Film	Nominated
2017	The Endless River	The Nassau Film Festival	United States	Best Fiction Film	Nominated
2017	The Endless River	Wolves Independent International Film Festival	Lithuania	Best Narrative Film	Nominated
2017	The Endless River	Green Mountain Film Festival	United States	Best Fiction Film	Won
2017	The Endless River	Hell Chess Festival	Spain	Best Narrative Film	Nominated
2017	The Endless River	Rainier Independent Film Festival	United States	Best Fiction Film	Nominated
2017	Only Five Minutes	Manchester International Short Film Festival	United Kingdom	Best Experimental Film	Nominated
2017	The Endless River	Vero Beach Wine & Film Festival	United States	Best Fiction Film	Nominated
2017	The Endless River	Riverside International Film Festival	United States	Best Fiction Film	Won
2017	Only Five Minutes	Life Art Media Festival	Greece	Best Experimental Film	Nominated
2017	Only Five Minutes	Havana International Improv Fest	United States	Best Experimental Film	Nominated
2017	Only Five Minutes	The Earth Day Film Festival	United States	Best Experimental Film	Nominated
2017	Only Five Minutes	Uhvati Film Festival	Serbia	Best Disability Film	Nominated
2017	Only Five Minutes	Prince of Prestige Academy Award	United States	Best Experimental Film	Nominated
2017	Only Five Minutes	Wine Country Film Festival	United States	Courage in Cinema	Won
2018	Only Five Minutes	Entr'2 Marches International Film Festival	France	Best Disability Film	Nominated
2019	I Have Two Loves	Seoul International Cartoon and Animation Festival	South Korea	Best Video Animation	Nominated
2019	I Have Two Loves	Napoli Film Festival	Italy	Best Video Art	Nominated
2021	Life	Slamdance Film Festival	United States	Department of Anarchy	Nominated
2021	Life	Slamdance Film Festival	United States	Honorable Mention, George Starks Spirit of Slamdance	Won
2021	Agnès Varda	Indie Shorts Mag Film Festival	United States	Best Documentary Film	Nominated
2021	Agnès Varda	Indiex Film Fest	United States	Best Documentary Film	Nominated
2021	Agnès Varda	Screen ATX	United States	Best Score Film	Nominated
2021	Agnès Varda	Screen ATX	United States	Best Documentary Film	Nominated
2021	I'm Monica Bellucci	Independent Shorts Awards	United States	Best Experimental Film	Nominated
2021	I'm Monica Bellucci	Flatness Film Awards	United States	Best Experimental Film	Nominated

== See also ==
- Agnès Varda
- Abbas Kiarostami
- Experimental film
