= Chronicles (TV series) =

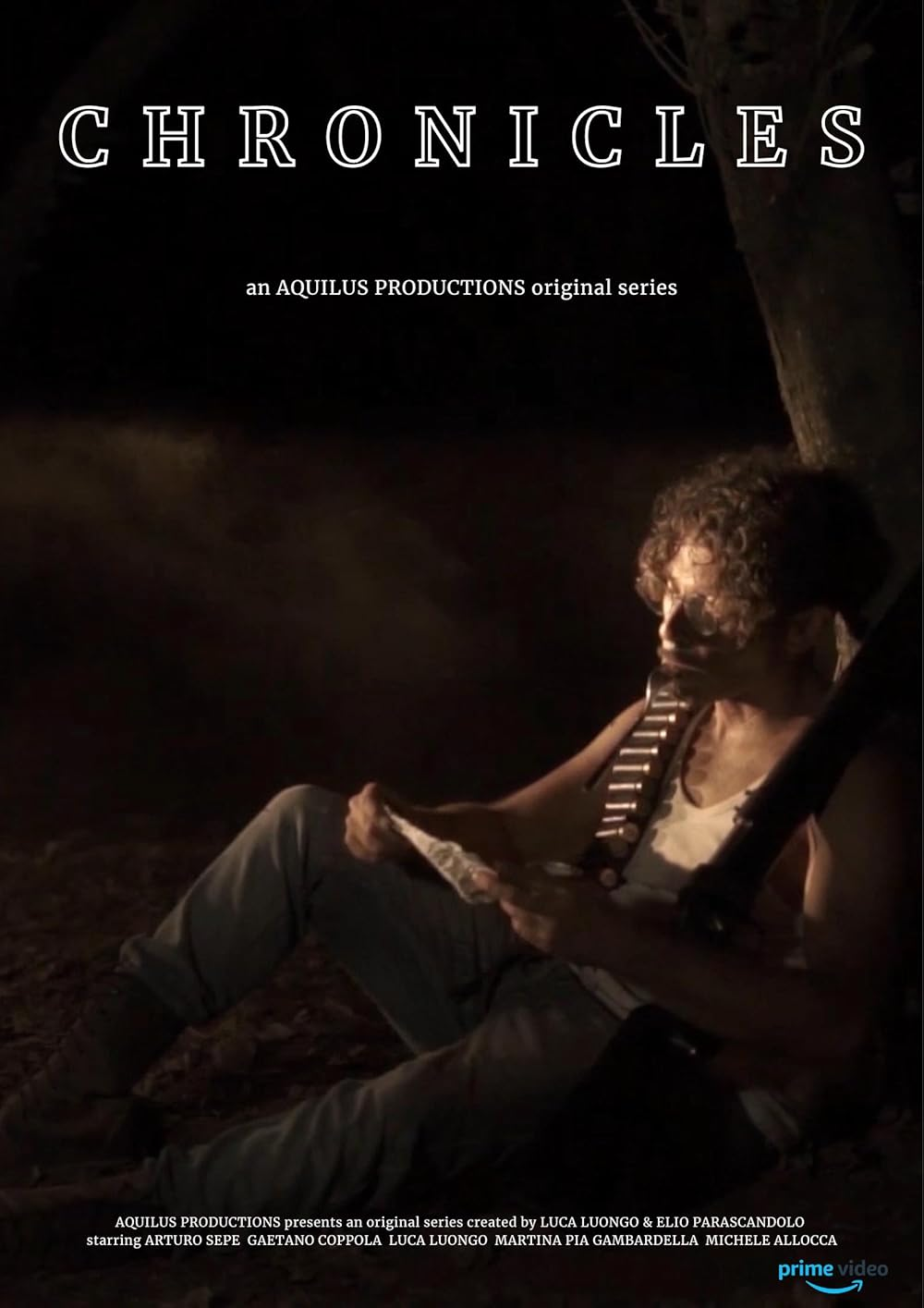
- Official poster
- Genre: Western; Drama
- Created by: Luca Luongo; Elio Parascandolo
- Written by: Luca Luongo
- Directed by: Luca Luongo
- Starring: Arturo Sepe; Gaetano Coppola; Luca Luongo
- Music by: Sebastiano Della Bianchina
- Country of origin: Italy
- Original language: Italian
- No. of episodes: 3

Production
- Executive producers: Elio Parascandolo, Silvio Rizzi Torino, Luca Luongo
- Producers: Elio Parascandolo, Silvio Rizzi Torino, Luca Luongo
- Cinematography: Pierino Santella
- Running time: 12–22 minutes
- Production company: Aquilus Productions

Original release
- Network: Amazon Prime Video
- Release: 1 February 2022

Chronicles is an Italian western drama television miniseries produced by Aquilus Productions for Amazon Prime Video. Released in 2022, the series combines elements of the western genre with contemporary Italian rural settings, presenting a short-format narrative focused on crime, survival, and moral conflict.

== Plot ==
Chronicles follows the intersecting paths of three men – Mick, Max, and Joe – whose lives become entangled following a failed arms deal and the disappearance of a suitcase containing valuable loot. Set in an isolated countryside environment, the series explores themes of betrayal, desperation, and the consequences of personal choices, drawing stylistic inspiration from classic western narratives while remaining grounded in a modern Italian context.

== Cast ==
- Arturo Sepe as Mick
- Gaetano Coppola as Max
- Luca Luongo as Joe
- Martina Pia Gambardella as Tonia
- Michele Allocca as Filo

== Production ==
The series was produced by Aquilus Productions and directed by Luca Luongo. Filming took place in rural locations in Italy, chosen to emphasize isolation and reinforce the western atmosphere through landscape and setting. The production aimed to reinterpret traditional western themes within a contemporary European framework.

== Episodes ==
The miniseries consists of three episodes of varying length:

- Episode 1 – approximately 14 minutes
- Episode 2 – approximately 22 minutes
- Episode 3 – approximately 12 minutes

== Release ==
Chronicles was released in 2022 on Amazon Prime Video, where it became available to audiences in United States and United Kingdom.

== Media coverage ==
Coverage of the series has primarily appeared in Italian online publications and independent film media. Commentators noted its attempt to merge western genre conventions with Italian settings and its concise episodic format, which distinguishes it from traditional television productions.
