= The Cat Who Wished to Be a Man =

1973 novel by Lloyd Alexander

- Cover of the first edition
- Author: Lloyd Alexander
- Language: English
- Genre: Fantasy novel
- Published: E. P. Dutton, 1973
- Publication place: United States
- Media type: Print
- Pages: 107

The Cat Who Wished to Be a Man (1973) is a children's comic fantasy novel by Lloyd Alexander. In Japan, it was adapted into a stage musical by the Shiki Theatre Company which has run since 1979 to this day.

== Plot ==
Lionel, a housecat given the power of speech by the magician Stephanus, begs his master to turn him into a man. After many objections concerning the depravity of humans, Stephanus relents, and the transformed Lionel begins his adventures to the town of Brightford. The mayor and his officers are plaguing Brightford with capricious rule and economic hardship. The mayor is especially covetous of the inn belonging to Gillian, with whom Lionel begins a rocky friendship. Lionel becomes entangled in the struggles of Brightford, and escalates the conflicts between the mayor and the people, while falling in love with Gillian as he becomes more and more human.
