= August Bondi =

American activist (1833–1907)

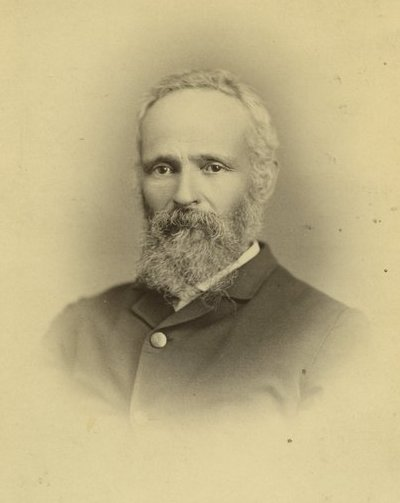
- Born: July 21, 1833; Vienna, Austria
- Died: September 30, 1907 (aged 74); St. Louis, Missouri, United States
- Military career
- Allegiance: United States
- Branch: Union Army
- Service years: 1861–
- Unit: 5th Kansas Cavalry Regiment
- Conflicts: Bleeding Kansas (1854–1861); American Civil War (1861–1865)

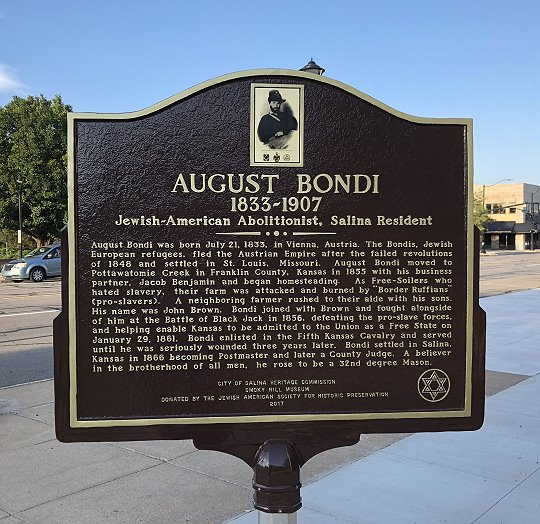
A Salina, Ks., historical marker: "August Bondi, 1833–1907, Jewish-American Abolitionist, Salina Resident"

August Bondi (Jewish name Anshl; July 21, 1833, in Vienna, Austria – September 30, 1907, in St. Louis, Missouri, United States) was an Austrian-American Jew involved in the Border War (Bleeding Kansas) and later the American Civil War. In Kansas, he was a part of the Pottawatomie Rifles and fought alongside abolitionists John Brown and James Lane.

August Bondi was born July 21, 1833, in Vienna, Austria. The Bondis, Jewish European refugees, fled the Austrian Empire after the failed revolutions of 1848 and settled in St. Louis, Missouri. August Bondi moved to the Pottawatomie Creek valley in Franklin County, Kansas in 1855 with his business partner, Jacob Benjamin and began homesteading. The Bondi and Benjamin homesteads were near the forks of Mosquito Creek northwest of Dutch Henry's Crossing (Lane, Kansas).

Some sources claim that, as Free Soilers who hated slavery, their farm was attacked and burned by "Border Ruffians" (pro-slavers), and that a neighboring farmer, John Brown, rushed to their aide with his sons. However, Bondi recounts in his autobiography that he first met Brown's sons when their herd of Devon cattle wandered onto his farm, and he first met John Brown while traveling to elect a delegate to the 1855 Free State Constitutional Convention. The Brown family did help to evict a pro-slavery squatter from Bondi's claim while he was in St. Louis in January 1856, and Bondi's farm was burned while he was away guarding pro-slavery prisoners captured during the Battle of Black Jack in June 1856.

Bondi, along with several other Free Staters, laid out the town of Greeley, Kansas in December 1856. Bondi became Postmaster, served as town constable and lived on a farm south of Greeley until enlisting in the Union Army in November 1861. Bondi enlisted in the 5th Kansas Cavalry and served until he was seriously wounded in action three years later at Monticello, AR on September 11, 1864, and discharged December 2, 1864. Bondi settled in Salina, Kansas in 1866 becoming Postmaster and later a County Judge. A believer in the brotherhood of all men, he rose to be a 32nd-degree Mason. Bondi died September 30, 1907, while visiting St. Louis.

Lloyd Alexander wrote a historical novel for young people titled, Border Hawk: August Bondi, illustrated by Bernie Krigstein.
