= Gypsy Rizka =

1999 novel by Lloyd Alexander

- First edition
- Author: Lloyd Alexander
- Language: English
- Genre: Children's Literature, Fantasy
- Published: E. P. Dutton, 1999
- Media type: Print

Gypsy Rizka is a light-hearted novel by Lloyd Alexander about a girl who survives on her own wit.

== Plot summary ==
Rizka is a gypsy who lives just outside a town in a vardo and waits for the return of her gypsy father after the death of her mother. She has Big Franko looking out for her and the company of her cat Petzel. Throughout the story, she experiences numerous adventures helping out friends and folks in town as well as outwitting local town official Sharpnack, who will do anything to get rid of Rizka.
