= News Chronicle (disambiguation) =

The News Chronicle was a British daily newspaper published from 1930 to 1960.

News Chronicle may also refer to:

- Bingham News Chronicle, a weekly newspaper published in Blackfoot, Idaho, U.S.
- Green Bay News-Chronicle, a daily newspaper published from 1972 to 2005 in Green Bay, Wisconsin, U.S.
- News Chronicle Tournament, a professional golf tournament played in England from 1936 to 1951
- Tama-Toledo News Chronicle, a regional newspaper based in Tama, Iowa, U.S.

== See also ==
- The Chronicle (disambiguation)
- New Chronicles (Italian: Nuova Cronica), a 14th-century history of Florence
