= The Chronicle =

The Chronicle may refer to:

== Publications ==
- The Augusta Chronicle, Georgia, U.S.
- The Austin Chronicle, Texas, U.S.
- The Chronicle (Barton, Vermont), U.S.
- The Chronicle (Centralia, Washington), U.S.
- The Chronicle (Creswell, Oregon), U.S.
- The Chronicle (Dominica)
- The Chronicle of Higher Education
- The Chronicle of Philanthropy
- The Chronicle (St. Helens), Oregon, U.S.
- The Chronicle (South Australia)
- The Chronicle (Two Rivers), Wisconsin, U.S.
- The Chronicle (Willimantic), Connecticut, U.S.
- The Chronicle (Zimbabwe)
- Short form of the name of the Commercial & Financial Chronicle, New York City, U.S.
- The Duke Chronicle Duke University, Durham, North Carolina, U.S.
- The Houston Chronicle, Texas, U.S.
- Krónika, Hungarian-language Romanian newspaper
- The San Francisco Chronicle, California, U.S.
- The Toowoomba Chronicle, Queensland, Australia

== Other uses ==
- The Chronicle (TV series), 2001–02 American science fiction television series
- "The Chronicle" (Seinfeld ), ninth-season episode of the American sitcom Seinfeld
- The Chronicles (E.S.G. album), 2008 hip hop compilation album

== See also ==
- Chronicle (disambiguation)
- Evening Chronicle (disambiguation)
- News Chronicle (disambiguation)
- The Chronicle-Journal, Thunder Bay, Ontario, Canada
