= First Chronicle =

First Chronicle, First Chronicles, or Primary Chronicle may refer to:

- Novgorod First Chronicle, a Rus' literary work
- The First Chronicles of the Hebrew Bible
- Primary Chronicle of the Kievan Rus'
- Sofia First Chronicle, a 15th-century Russian work
- The First Chronicles of Druss the Legend, a 1993 fantasy novel by David Gemmell

== See also ==
- Chronicle (disambiguation)
- List of chronicles
