= Shiki Theatre Company =

Japanese theatre company

Shiki Theatre Company (劇団四季, Gekidan Shiki; Lit. Four Seasons Theatre Company) is one of Japan's largest theatre companies. Shiki Theatre Company employs around 1,400 actors and staff, and stages more than 3,000 performances to around 3 million audience members a year. It operates seven theaters for their exclusive use. Every year, five or six of the company's productions go on tour. Shiki is one of the largest theatrical companies in the world. Seven theaters in Tokyo, Osaka, and Nagoya are dedicated to Shiki.

== History ==
The Shiki Theatre Company was established on July 14, 1953 by 10 university students including Keita Asari (浅利慶太). Their aim was “bringing about a revolution in the theater world.” The organization was established as a stock holding company in 1967.

The founders' premiere was Anouilh’s “Ardèle ou la Marguerite" in 1954. There was a saying that 150 people were in the audience.

== Plays and musicals ==
Shiki stages three major types of drama. Originally, Shiki Theatre Company staged Shingeki plays. However, in the late 1970s, they branched out into other forms of theatre and found success by staging western and Japanese musicals. All of the company's productions are in Japanese.

Shiki is also known for producing original language musicals. One such example is the Showa trilogy, a set of three musicals about World War II and the aftermath. The series consists of Ri Kōran, a musical about the famous Manchurian-Japanese singer; Foreign Hill (異国の丘, Ikoku no Oka) which tells the story of Japanese prisoners of war at an internment camp in Siberia; and Southern Cross (南十字星, Minami Shūjisei) about the trials of innocent B and C-class war criminals in Indonesia.

They have also produced several original "family musicals" based on classical literature for children, such as Anne of Green Gables and The Prince and the Pauper. Others of their originals include a musical adaptation of Mamoru Hosoda's anime film The Boy and the Beast, and The Ghost and the Lady, based on a story from the manga The Black Museum. In 2024, The Ghost and the Lady was voted the top musical of 2024 by contributors to Musical magazine.

== Casting ==
Shiki follows a strict meritocratic system in their casting process. The company welcomes all talented performers and does not cast well-known stars from television or movies simply based on their fame. They prioritize the performers' skills and whether they are able to move audiences.

== Schools and programs ==
In addition to performances, Shiki also provides theater schools and various workshops to train new actors. A number of renowned actors received training at Shiki.

== Charitable project ==
In 2008, Shiki launched the charitable project Kokoro no Gekijo (Theater of Hearts), which invites children in areas with few opportunities to watch theater to attend at no cost. The company also travels to distant islands such as Rishiri Island in Hokkaido to perform. The shows are offered to elementary school students, and the performances teach children concepts such as the “importance of life,” “consideration for other people,” and the “joy in having faith in each other.” The project has grown to 444 performances in 180 cities across the nation. In 2019 alone, around 560,000 children attended the performances. These activities were interrupted by the pandemic, but resumed in April 2023.

== International network ==
As new plays are produced on Broadway and West End each year and performed worldwide, a number of non-Japanese producers have asked Shiki to produce their plays in Japan. Shiki has been in a partnership with Disney for over 20 years, since the company's opening of Beauty and the Beast in 1995. Almost all Disney stage productions are presented in Japan by Shiki (with exceptions such as Newsies and Mary Poppins, which were licensed by Toho). Shiki has also worked with Andrew Lloyd-Webber, the composer of musicals including Cats and The Phantom of the Opera. Shiki has also worked with production companies on the production of Mamma Mia! and Wicked. The Cats production in Japanese premiered in Tokyo in 1983. It has since been performed continuously.

== Events ==
In December 2023, Shiki held a "Lion King" exhibition to celebrate the musical's 25th anniversary in Japan. Shiki's Lion King musical first opened in 1998 in Tokyo.

== Collaboration ==
Shiki has its own theater at WATERS takeshiba. From August 6, 2021 to July 31, 2022, a project in collaboration with The Phantom of the Opera took place. This collaboration consisted of a concept room that was inspired by the heroine Christine's dressing room, and was limited to a room per day. From September 13, 2021 to February 28, 2022, a film-inspired lunch and dinner program was also promoted. This experience was only offered at WATERS takeshiba.

== Musical Awards Tokyo ==
Shiki's The Ghost and the Lady (new world premiere) won the Musical Awards Tokyo's Grand Award.

== Theatres ==
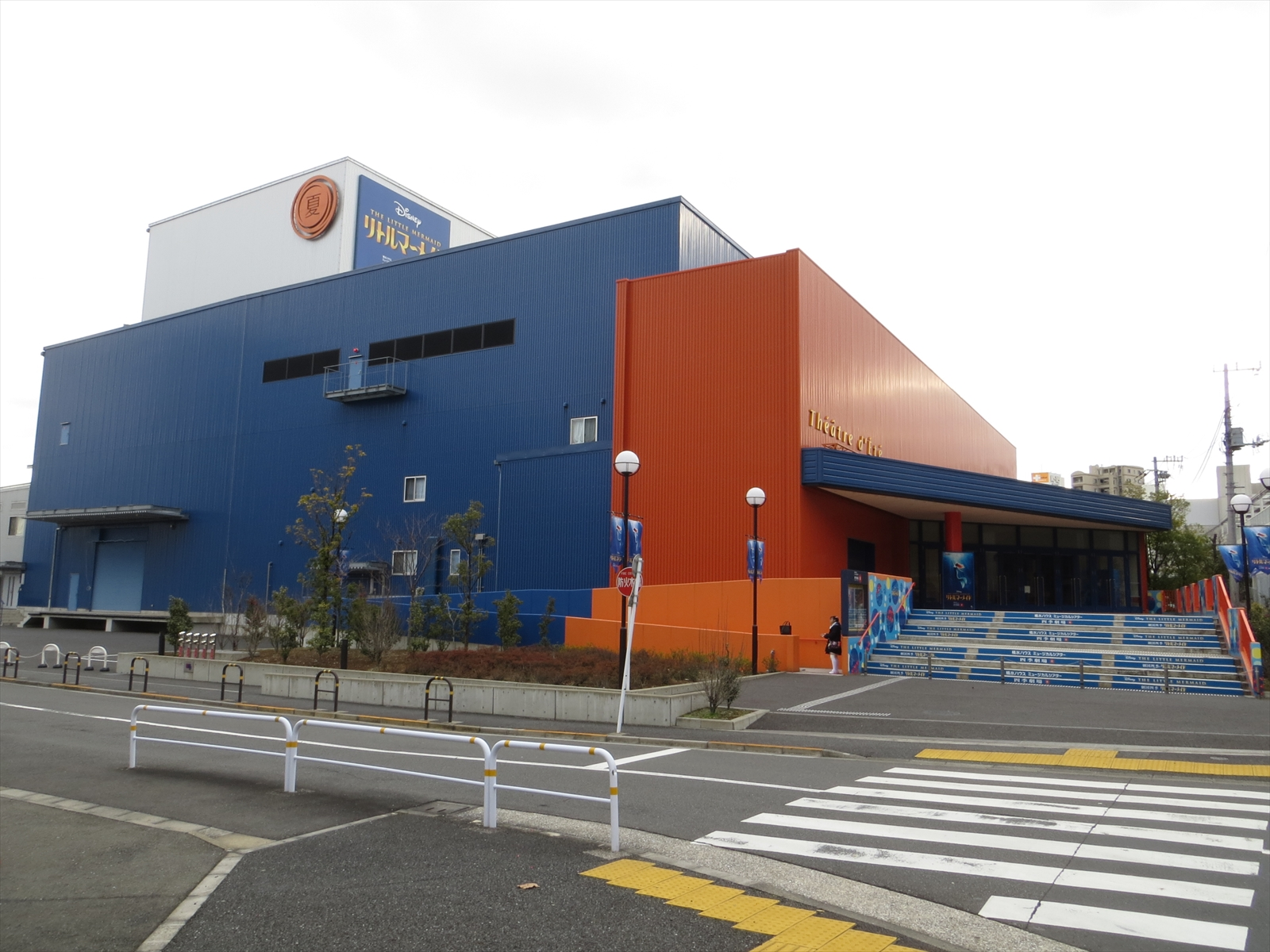
The Shiki Theatre NATSU in 2015

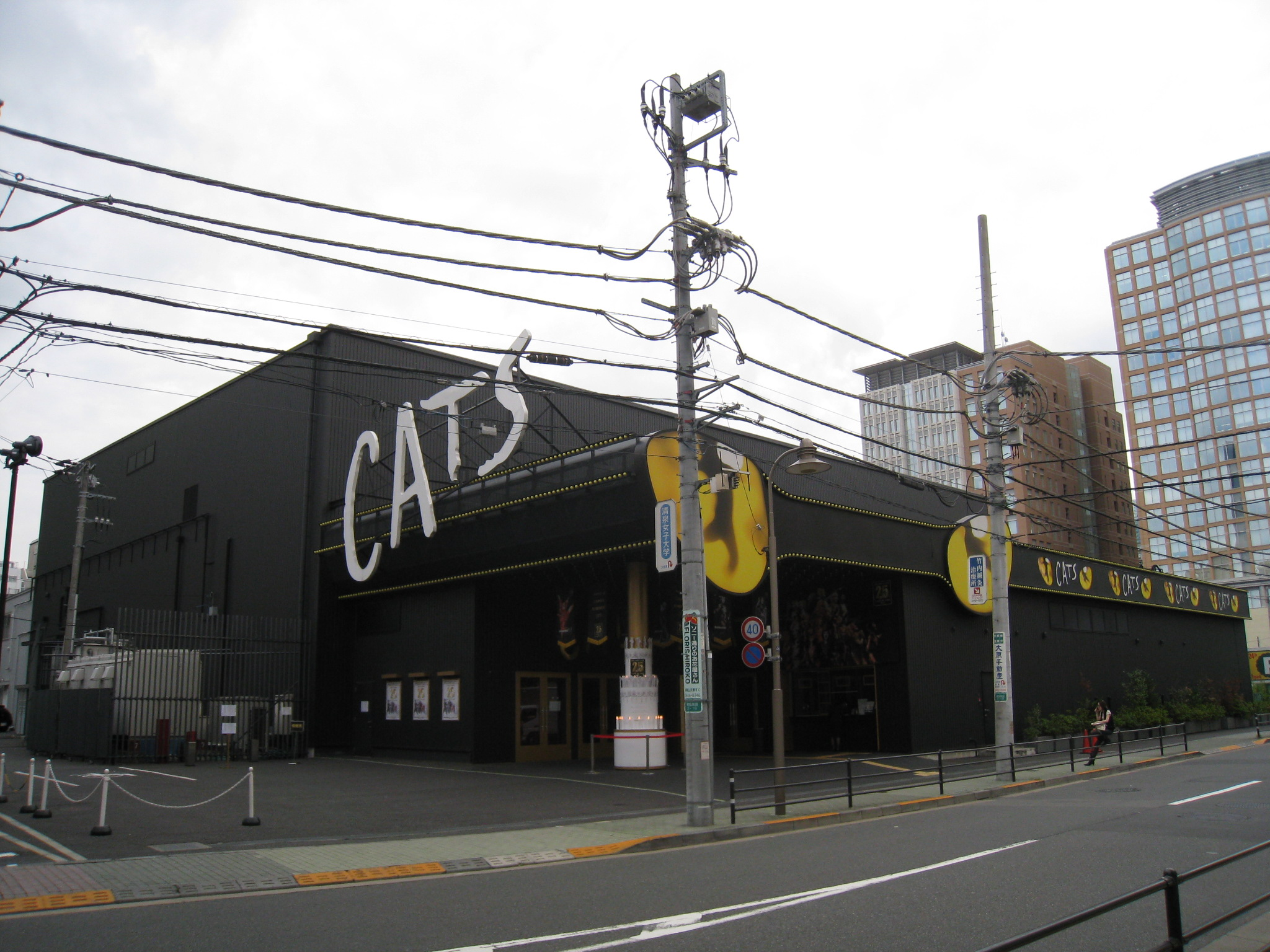
The CATS Theatre in 2008

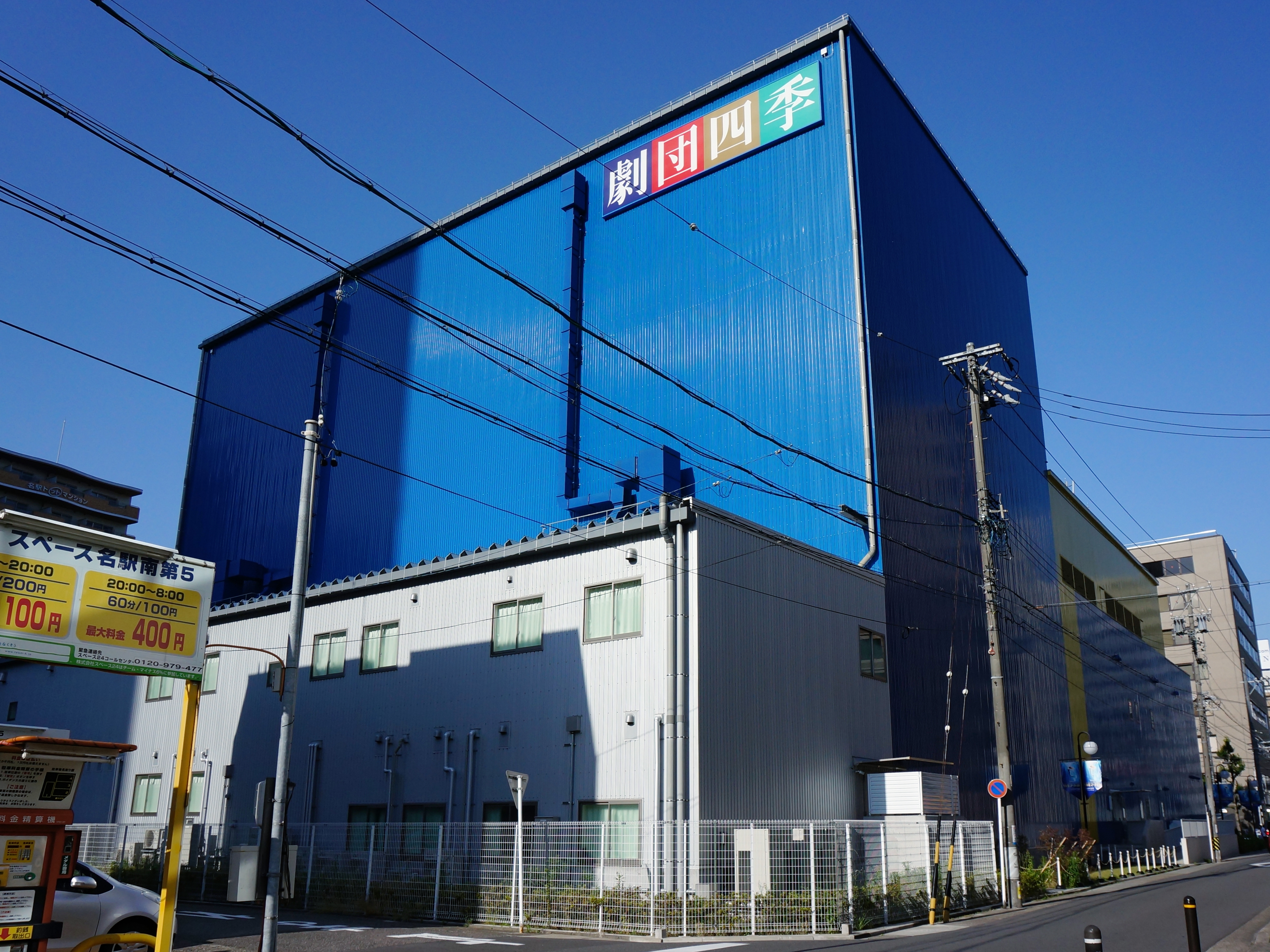
The Nagoya Shiki Theatre in 2018

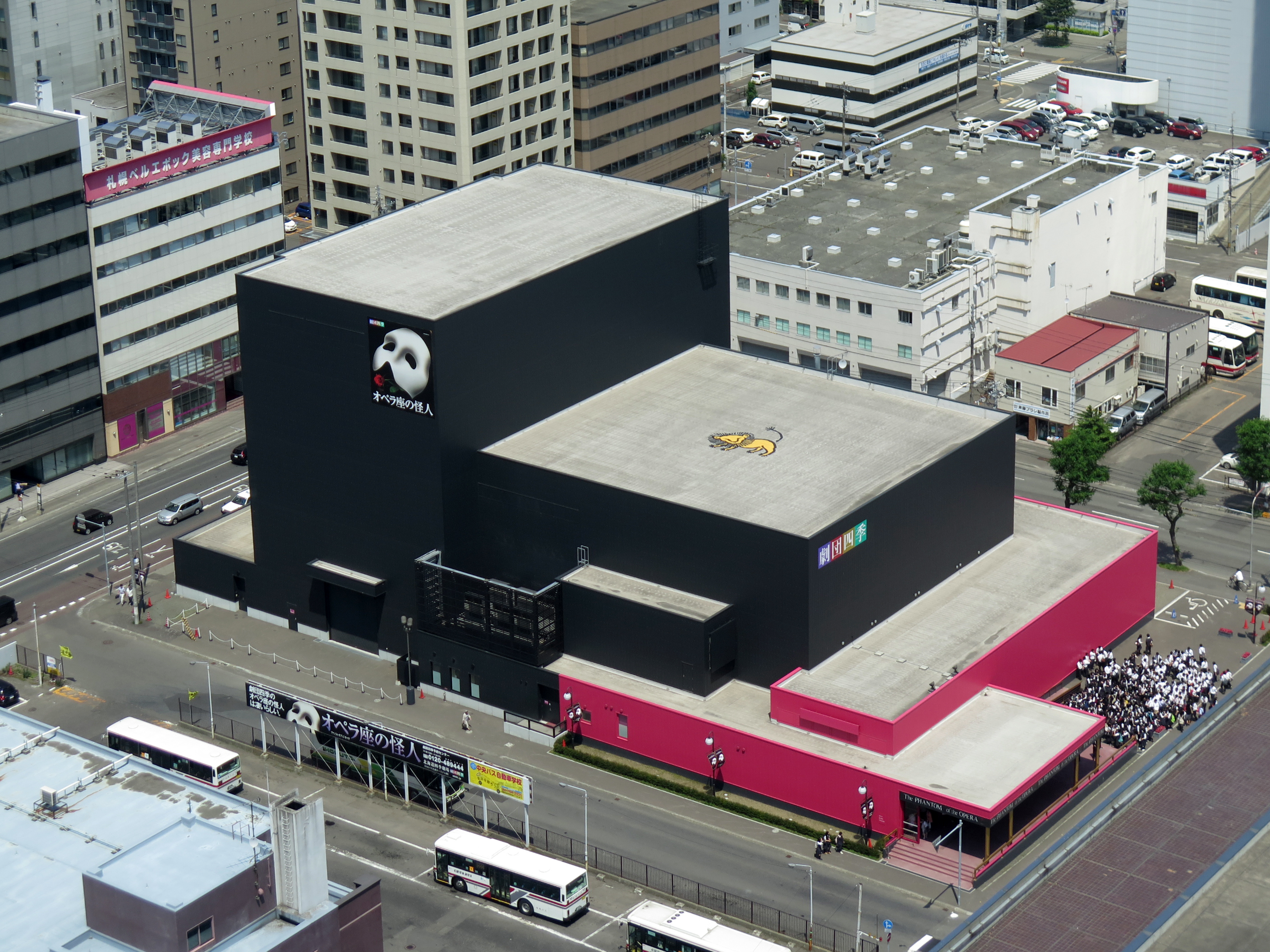
The Hokkaido Shiki Theatre in 2014

The Shiki Theatre Company owns and operates several theatres across Japan.

=== Tokyo ===
- JR-EAST Shiki Theatre HARU – an approx. 1,500-seat theatre; opened in January 2021.
- JR-EAST Shiki Theatre AKI – an approx. 1,200-seat theatre; opened in October 2020.
- Theatre JIYU – an approximately 500-seat theatre.
- Dentsu Shiki Theatre UMI – an approx. 1,200-seat theatre; opened in December 2002.
- Ariake Shiki Theatre – an approx. 1,200-seat theatre purpose-built for the Shiki production of Disney's The Lion King; opened in September 2021.

=== Nagoya ===
- The Nagoya Shiki Theatre – an approx. 1,200-seat theatre in Nagoya; opened in October 2016. In 2025, after productions of The Ghost and the Lady and Mamma Mia, this theatre is set to be closed and Shiki will move to a new location in Nagoya.

=== Osaka ===
- The Osaka Shiki Theatre – an approx. 1,200-seat theatre. It opened in January 2005, and is located on the seventh floor of the commercial complex HERBIS PLAZA ENT.

=== Former Owned Theatres ===
- The Fukuoka City Theatre – an approx. 1,100-seat theatre; opened in May 1996, closed in May 2010.
- Shiki Theatre HARU – an approx. 1,200-seat theatre; opened in December 1998, closed in May 2017.
- Shiki Theatre HARU – an approx. 900-seat theatre; opened in October 1998, closed in June 2017.
- The New Nagoya Musical Theatre – an approx. 1000-seat theatre; opened in May 1999, closed in August 2016.
- The CATS Theatre (Gotanda)– theatre purpose-built for the Shiki production of Cats; opened in November 2004, closed in May 2009.
- The Canon CATS Theatre (Yokohama)– theatre purpose-built for the Shiki production of Cats; opened in November 2009, closed in November 2012.
- Shiki Theatre NATSU – an approx. 1,200-seat theatre; opened in July 2010, closed in June 2021.
- The Hokkaido Shiki Theatre – an approx. 900-seat theatre; opened in January 2011, closed in March 2020.
- The CATS Theatre (Oimachi)– an approx. 1,200-seat theatre purpose-built for the Shiki production of Cats; opened in August 2018, closed in June 2021.

== Productions ==
Past and present productions by the Shiki Theatre Company include the following:

=== Original shows and adaptations ===
- A Dream Within a Dream (夢から醒めた夢, Yume Kara Sameta Yume), based on a novel by Jirō Akagawa
- Yuta's Enchanting Friends (ユタと不思議な仲間たち, Yuta to Fushigina Nakama-tachi), based on the novel by Miura Tetsuo.
- A Robot in the Garden(ロボット・イン・ザ・ガーデン), based on the novel by Deborah Install
- The Boy and the Beast (Bakemono no Ko), adapted from animated film of same name
- Li Xianglan the Musical
- The Ghost & the Lady

==== Showa trilogy ====
- Ri Koran
- Foreign Hill
- Southern Cross

==== Children's theatre ====
- Anne of Green Gables
- Maeterlinck's The Blue Bird (Sometimes re-titled: Dreaming)
- Lloyd Alexander's The Cat Who Wished to Be a Man
- The Emperor's New Clothes
- The Story of a Seagull and the Cat Who Taught Her to Fly(based on the book by Luis Sepúlveda)

=== Western shows ===
- Disney's Aida
- A Chorus Line
- An American in Paris
- Contact
- Crazy for You
- Equus
- Evita
- Jesus Christ Superstar
- Mamma Mia!
- Andrew Lloyd-Webber's Phantom of the Opera
- Le Passe Muraille
- Spring Awakening
- West Side Story
- Wicked (2007–present)

==== Family entertainment ====
- Disney's Aladdin (2015–present)
- Disney's Beauty and the Beast (2022–present)
- Cats (1983–present)
- Disney's The Hunchback of Notre Dame (2016–present)
- Disney's The Lion King (1998–present)
- Disney's The Little Mermaid (2013–present) (Non-replica production)
- Disney's Frozen (2021–present)
- The Phantom of the Opera (1988–present)
- Disney's Tarzan (2025–present)
- The Ghost and the Lady (2024-2026)
