= Agnès Varda (film) =

- Directed by: Mohammad Mohammadian
- Written by: Mohammad Mohammadian
- Release date: 2020
- Language: English

Agnès Varda is a biographical documentary film from 2020 by the Iranian writer and director Mohammad Mohammadian about the French filmmaker Agnès Varda.

== Plot ==
A brief overview of the life and cinema of the French director, screenwriter, photographer, and installation artist Agnès Varda. Her work has been pioneering and central to the development of the highly influential French New Wave cinematic movement of the 1950s and 1960s. Historically, Varda is considered the mother of the New Wave.

== Awards ==
Année	Festival du film	Pays	Catégorie	Résultat
2021	Indie Shorts Mag Film Festival	United States	Best Documentary Film	Nominated
2021	Screen ATX	United States	Best Documentary Film	Nominated
2021	Ischia Global Film Festival	Italy	Best Documentary Film	Nominated
2021	Horsetooth Intl. Film Festival	United States	Best Documentary Film	Nominated
2021	International Multicultural Film Festival	Australia	Best Documentary Film	Nominated
2021	Culture Cinema	India	Best Documentary Film	Nominated
2021	Apox Film Festival	Croatia	Best Documentary Film	Nominated

== See also ==
- Agnès Varda
- French New Wave
