= Time Cat: The Remarkable Journeys of Jason and Gareth =

1963 children's fantasy novel by Lloyd Alexander

Time Cat
- First edition
- Author: Lloyd Alexander
- Cover artist: Bill Sokol; Wayne McLoughlin (Puffin)
- Genre: Fantasy novel, Children's literature
- Publisher: Holt, Rinehart and Winston
- Publication date: 1963; 2004, Puffin Books
- Publication place: United States
- Media type: Print (hardcover, paperback)
- Pages: 191 (first); 206 pp
- ISBN: 0-14-240107-2 (Puffin)
- OCLC: 872567416
- LC Class: PZ8.A37 Ti

Time Cat is a children's fantasy novel by Lloyd Alexander, first published in 1963. It was his first children's fantasy.

== Origins ==
Alexander succeeded on his first try writing fantasy for children, which he later called "the most creative and liberating experience of my life." Time Cat was a fantasy inspired by one of his pet cats, Solomon. Solomon would visit the office while Alexander was working, but the author would never see him come or go. He recalled in 1999:

I began to have a private joke, playing a game as it were, pretending to appear and disappear whenever he wanted to. ... If a cat has nine lives, maybe he's gone off to visit one of his nine lives. At that moment, it suddenly occurred to me – this sounds like an idea for a whole book. Each chapter would be one of his nine lives. I didn't give him a credit in the book. But I should have, even though he didn't do any work.

The nine settings were "nine places in the past that a cat would logically visit", discovered by reading and research. (Note: During research for Time Cat, Alexander studied Welsh mythology for an episode in Wales. He decided to save those rich ideas for another work and substituted the episode in Ireland. Next year he published the first volume of his most popular work, The Chronicles of Prydain, which is rooted in Welsh mythology. • Viguers, Ruth Hill (1969). Cornelia Meigs (ed.). A Critical History of Children's Literature. Macmillan Publishing co. p. 461. ISBN 0-02-583900-4.)

== Plot summary ==
Jason learns that his cat, Gareth, is able to talk and has the power to travel to nine different points in world history (his "nine lives"). Jason convinces Gareth to take him along and their adventures begin where cats are considered divine, in Ancient Egypt in the year 2700 BC.

Subsequently, they visit Rome, where they are taken in by the Old Cats of Caesar. There, they are kidnapped to a village where Cerdric Longtooth, the chieftain of the village tries to burn him but his wife objects. Later on, the villagers find out about Gareth. They refer to Gareth as a "Catamountain." Jason takes this opportunity to pretend to be the beholder of the supposedly Ferocious beast. They later on become friends with the village and leave after another catamountain arrives. This time, with kittens. Later, they visit Britain (55 BC), Ireland (AD 411), Japan (998), Italy (1468), Peru (1555), the Isle of Man (1588), Germany (1600), and the United States (1775).

After nine episodes they return home. Gareth says he will never again speak to Jason, and he forbids Jason ever to mention their travels to anyone. It is not difficult for Jason to obey, since he doubts that anyone would believe his story. However, he has acquired an ankh pendant as a memento and he uses it to communicate with Gareth without talking.
