= Drama (film and television) =

Genre

In film and television, drama is a category or genre of narrative fiction (or semi-fiction) intended to be more serious than humorous in tone. The drama of this kind is usually qualified with additional terms that specify its particular super-genre, macro-genre, or micro-genre, such as soap opera, police crime drama, political drama, legal drama, historical drama, domestic drama, teen drama, and comedy drama (dramedy). These terms tend to indicate a particular setting or subject matter, or they combine a drama's otherwise serious tone with elements that encourage a broader range of moods. To these ends, a primary element in a drama is the occurrence of conflict—emotional, social, or otherwise—and its resolution in the course of the storyline.

All forms of cinema or television that involve fictional stories are forms of drama in the broader sense if their storytelling is achieved by means of actors who represent (mimesis) characters. In this broader sense, drama is a mode distinct from novels, short stories, and narrative poetry or songs. In the modern era, before the birth of cinema or television, "drama" within theatre was a type of play that was neither a comedy nor a tragedy. It is this narrower sense that the film and television industries, along with film studies, adopted. "Radio drama" has been used in both senses—originally transmitted in a live performance, it has also been used to describe the more highbrow and serious end of the dramatic output of radio.

== Types of drama in film and television ==
The Screenwriters Taxonomy contends that film genres are fundamentally based upon a film's atmosphere, character and story, and therefore the labels "drama" and "comedy" are too broad to be considered a genre. Instead, the taxonomy contends that film dramas are a "Type" of film; listing at least ten different sub-types of film and television drama.

=== Docudrama ===
Docudramas are dramatized adaptations of real-life events. While not always completely accurate, the general facts are more-or-less true. The difference between a docudrama and a documentary is that in a documentary it uses real people to describe history or current events; in a docudrama it uses professionally trained actors to play the roles in the current event, that is "dramatized" a bit. Examples: Black Mass (2015) and Zodiac (2007).

=== Docufiction ===
Unlike docudramas, docu-fictional films combine documentary and fiction, where actual footage or real events are intermingled with recreated scenes. Examples: Interior. Leather Bar (2013) and Your Name Here (2015).

=== Comedy drama ===
Many otherwise serious productions have humorous scenes and characters intended to provide comic relief. A comedy drama has humor as a more central component of the story, along with serious content. Examples include Three Colours: White (1994), The Truman Show (1998), The Man Without a Past (2002), The Best Exotic Marigold Hotel (2011), and Silver Linings Playbook (2012).

=== Hypardrama ===
Coined by film professor Ken Dancyger, these stories exaggerate characters and situations to the point of becoming fable, legend or fairy tale. Examples: Fantastic Mr. Fox (2009) and Maleficent (2014).

=== Light drama ===
Light dramas are light-hearted stories that are, nevertheless, serious in nature. Examples: The Help (2011) and The Terminal (2004).

=== Psychological drama ===
Psychological dramas are dramas that focus on the characters' inner life and psychological problems. Examples: Requiem for a Dream (2000), Oldboy (2003), Babel (2006), Whiplash (2014), and Anomalisa (2015).

=== Satirical drama ===
Satire can involve humor, but the result is typically sharp social commentary that is anything but funny. Satire often uses irony or exaggeration to expose faults in society or individuals that influence social ideology. Examples: Thank You for Smoking (2005) and Idiocracy (2006).

=== Straight drama ===
Straight drama applies to those that do not attempt a specific approach to drama but, rather, consider drama as a lack of comedic techniques. Examples: Ghost World (2001) and Wuthering Heights (2011).

=== Tragedy ===
Like most tragedies in early theatres, Tragedy typically focuses on the downfall or suffering of a main character (or sometimes supporting characters) due to a series of unfortunate events, often culminating in their demise at the end of the film or television series. Examples: The Elephant Man (1980), Grave of the Fireflies (1988), The Green Mile (1999), The Mist (2007), and The Boy in the Striped Pyjamas (2008).

== Type/genre combinations ==
According to the Screenwriters' Taxonomy, all film descriptions should contain their type (comedy or drama) combined with one (or more) of the eleven super-genres. This combination does not create a separate genre, but rather, provides a better understanding of the film.

According to the taxonomy, combining the type with the genre does not create a separate genre. For instance, the "Horror Drama" is simply a dramatic horror film (as opposed to a comedic horror film). "Horror Drama" is not a genre separate from the horror genre or the drama type.

=== Crime drama ===
Crime dramas explore themes of truth, justice, and freedom, and contain the fundamental dichotomy of "criminal vs. lawman". Crime films make the audience jump through a series of mental "hoops"; it is not uncommon for the crime drama to use verbal gymnastics to keep the audience and the protagonist on their toes. Crime dramas often include settings like the scene of the crime, the police station, forensic labs, and in some cases, courts of law. This feeds into the drama, and it adds senses of character to the film.

Examples of crime dramas include: The Godfather (1972), Chinatown (1974), Goodfellas (1990), The Usual Suspects (1995), and The Big Short (2015).

=== Fantasy drama ===
According to Eric R. Williams, the hallmark of fantasy drama films is "a sense of wonderment, typically played out in a visually intense world inhabited by mythic creatures, magic or superhuman characters. Props and costumes within these films often belie a sense of mythology and folklore – whether ancient, futuristic, or other-worldly. The costumes, as well as the exotic world, reflect the personal, inner struggles that the hero faces in the story."

Examples of fantasy dramas include The Lord of the Rings (2001–2003), Pan's Labyrinth (2006), Where the Wild Things Are (2009), and Life of Pi (2012).

=== Horror drama ===
Horror dramas often involve the central characters isolated from the rest of society. These characters are often teenagers or people in their early twenties (the genre's central audience) and are eventually killed off during the course of the film. Thematically, horror films often serve as morality tales, with the killer serving up violent penance for the victims' past sins. Metaphorically, these become battles of Good vs. Evil or Purity vs. Sin.

Psycho (1960), The Shining (1980), The Conjuring (2013), It (2017), Mother! (2017), and Hereditary (2018) are examples of horror drama films.

=== Life drama (day-in-the-life) ===
Day-in-the-life films takes small events in a person's life and raises their level of importance. The "small things in life" feel as important to the protagonist (and the audience) as the climactic battle in an action film, or the final shootout in a western. Often, the protagonists deal with multiple, overlapping issues in the course of the film – just as we do in life.

Films of this type/genre combination include: The Wrestler (2008), Fruitvale Station (2013), Locke (2013), The Great Beauty (2013) and The Last Beautiful Thing (2025).

=== Romantic drama ===
Romantic dramas are films with central themes that reinforce our beliefs about love (e.g.: themes such as "love at first sight", "love conquers all", or "there is someone out there for everyone"); the story typically revolves around characters falling into (and out of, and back into) love. Romantic drama often involves two characters who go through various trials and tribulations together as their relationship grows over time. often times there is a conflict between the two characters, which results in a temporary separation, but they often come back together for an optimistic ending.

Annie Hall (1977), The Notebook (2004), Carol (2015), Her (2013), The Great Gatsby (2013) and La La Land (2016) are examples of romance dramas.

=== Science fiction drama ===
The science fiction drama film is often the story of a protagonist (and their allies) facing something "unknown" that has the potential to change the future of humanity; this unknown may be represented by a villain with incomprehensible powers, a creature we do not understand, or a scientific scenario that threatens to change the world; the science fiction story forces the audience to consider the nature of human beings, the confines of time or space or the concepts of human existence in general.

Examples include: Metropolis (1927), Planet of the Apes (1968), A Clockwork Orange (1971), Blade Runner (1982) and its sequel Blade Runner 2049 (2017), Children of Men (2006), Interstellar (2014), and Arrival (2016).

=== Sports drama ===
In the sports super-genre, characters will be playing sports. Thematically, the story is often one of "Our Team" versus "Their Team"; their team will always try to win, and our team will show the world that they deserve recognition or redemption; the story does not always have to involve a team. The story could also be about an individual athlete or the story could focus on an individual playing on a team.

Examples of this genre/type include: The Hustler (1961), Hoosiers (1986), Remember the Titans (2000), and Moneyball (2011).

=== War drama ===
War films typically tell the story of a small group of isolated individuals who – one by one – get killed (literally or metaphorically) by an outside force until there is a final fight to the death; the idea of the protagonists facing death is a central expectation in a war drama film. In a war film even though the enemy may out-number, or out-power, the hero, we assume that the enemy can be defeated if only the hero can figure out how.

Examples include: Apocalypse Now (1979), Come and See (1985), Braveheart (1995), Life Is Beautiful (1997), Black Book (2006), The Hurt Locker (2008), 1944 (2015), Wildeye (2015), and 1917 (2019).

=== Western drama ===
Films in the western super-genre often take place in the American Southwest or Mexico, with a large number of scenes occurring outdoors so we can soak in scenic landscapes. Visceral expectations for the audience include fistfights, gunplay, and chase scenes. There is also the expectation of spectacular panoramic images of the countryside including sunsets, wide open landscapes, and endless deserts and sky.

Examples of western dramas include: True Grit (1969) and its 2010 remake, Mad Max (1979), Unforgiven (1992), No Country for Old Men (2007), Django Unchained (2012), Hell or High Water (2016), and Logan (2017).

== Misidentified categories ==
Some film categories that use the word "comedy" or "drama" are not recognized by the Screenwriters Taxonomy as either a film genre or a film type. For instance, "Melodrama" and "Screwball Comedy" are considered pathways, while "romantic comedy" and "family drama" are macro-genres.

=== Family drama ===
A macro-genre in the Screenwriters Taxonomy. These films tell a story in which many of the central characters are related. The story revolves around how the family as a whole reacts to a central challenge. There are four micro-genres for the family drama: Family Bond, Family Feud, Family Loss, and Family Rift.

=== Melodrama ===
A sub-type of drama films that uses plots that appeal to the heightened emotions of the audience. Melodramatic plots often deal with "crises of human emotion, failed romance or friendship, strained familial situations, tragedy, illness, neuroses, or emotional and physical hardship". Film critics sometimes use the term "pejoratively to connote an unrealistic, pathos-filled, camp tale of romance or domestic situations with stereotypical characters (often including a central female character) that would directly appeal to feminine audiences". Also called "women's movies", "weepies", tearjerkers, or "chick flicks". If they are targeted to a male audience, then they are called "guy cry" films. Often considered "soap-opera" drama.

=== Liturgical drama / religious drama / Christian drama ===
Focuses on religious characters, mystery play, beliefs, and respect.

=== Crime drama / police procedural / legal drama / courtroom drama ===
Character development based on themes involving criminals, law enforcement and the legal system.

=== Historical drama ===
Films that focus on dramatic events in history.

=== Medical drama ===
Focuses on doctors, nurses, hospital staff, and ambulance saving victims and the interactions of their daily lives.

=== Teen drama ===
Focuses on teenage characters.

== See also ==
- List of drama films
- Bourgeois tragedy
- Domestic tragedy
- Dramatic structure
- Soap opera
- Tragicomedy

== General and cited references ==
- Banham, Martin, ed. 1998. The Cambridge Guide to Theatre. Cambridge: Cambridge University Press. ISBN 0-521-43437-8.
- Cook, Pam, and Mieke Bernink, eds. 1999. The Cinema Book. 2nd ed. London: British Film Institute. ISBN 0-851-70726-2.
- Elam, Keir. 1980. The Semiotics of Theatre and Drama. New Accents ser. London and New York: Methuen. ISBN 0-416-72060-9.
- Hayward, Susan. 1996. Key Concepts in Cinema Studies. Key Concepts ser. London: Routledge. ISBN 0-415-10719-9.
- Neale, Steve. 2000. Genre and Hollywood. London: Routledge. ISBN 0-415-02606-7.
- Sheehan, Helena. 1987. Irish Television Drama: A Society and Its Stories ISBN 0-86029-011-5
- Williams, Eric R. (2017) The Screenwriters Taxonomy: A Roadmap to Creative Storytelling. New York, NY: Routledge Press, Studies in Media Theory and Practice. ISBN 978-1-315-10864-3.
