= The Iron Ring =

1997 children's novel by Lloyd Alexander

- First edition
- Author: Lloyd Alexander
- Illustrator: Claudia Carlson (map)
- Cover artist: Jane Ray
- Language: English
- Genre: Fantasy, children's literature
- Published: 1997 (Dutton)
- Publication place: United States
- Media type: Print (hardcover & paperback)
- Pages: xv + 283 pp (first)
- ISBN: 0-525-45597-3 (first edition, hard)

The Iron Ring is a 1997 fantasy novel for children by American author Lloyd Alexander. It features a young king Tamar who leaves Sundari Palace on a quest in a land of humans and talking animals, which are inspired by Indian mythology. The caste system of India is one ground for conflict in the novel.

The book includes an author's note, a list of characters and places, a map, and a glossary with 27 entries, from acharya to suta.

== Origins ==
In the author's note, Alexander writes that "mythology of ancient India has always delighted and fascinated me—but, at first, in bits and pieces"; he later studied it. He explains one term from the glossary: "Dharma, the driving force of the present tale". The Iron Ring is not "a picture of India some thousands of years ago" or a retelling of Indian stories, although it "evokes the atmosphere, themes, and concerns threading through Indian literature".

As a boy, Alexander "loved all the world's mythologies"; "the King Arthur stories, fairy tales, mythology—things like that". His publisher attributes inspiration for many of his books to "the world's mythologies".

== Plot ==
The narrative consists of 36 chapters, in four parts.

=== Part I: The Iron Ring ===
Tamar, the king of the fictional realm of Sundari, is rudely awoken by the procession of a passing maharajah named Jaya. Jaya, disobeying the unwritten rules of courtesy, intrudes upon Tamar's house demanding an audience with Tamar for Jaya's own amusement. They play a fictional dice game called aksha, increasing the wagers placed on each successive roll. Finally Jaya calls the wager "life against life." Tamar loses the roll; therefore, his life is Jaya's to do with as Jaya sees fit. Jaya places a black iron ring on Tamar's finger as a sign of his bondage. Jaya says that he has pressing matters to which to attend, so Tamar should come to Jaya's palace in Mahapura. Furious and screaming, Tamar lunges for the king, but because of the ring, he falls to the ground.

Tamar is woken by his sage mentor Rajaswami, a brahmana, and quickly discovers that none of his courtiers remember Jaya's ever having been there at all. He has no proof, save the iron ring on his finger, that the encounter was any more than a dream. As a kshatriya, Tamar is honor-bound to make good on the debt he owes to Jaya because to him, dharma is the most important thing in the world. He sets out with Rajaswami, leaving his kingdom in the hands of his military commander, Darshan. The pair ride north through the Danda-Vana forest. They happen upon an enormous talking monkey being attacked by a large river-snake. The monkey, Hashkat, king of the monkeys, has attempted to steal the sapphire atop the head of the snake prince Shesha. Tamar wrestles Shesha in the water and is dragged under then saves Shesha from the weeds in which the serpent is entangled. Shesha pulls Tamar to the realm of the Naga Raja (snake king), where Tamar is given his choice of any of the thousands of precious jewels within the king's hall. He chooses a tiny ruby called the Fire Flower.

When Tamar surfaces, he is no longer in the part of the river whence he had left Rajaswami. Instead he is standing naked before a group of beautiful cowgirls called gopis. The most beautiful, Mirri, brings Tamar clothing out of pity, and Tamar is told eventually of the village's traditional "Choosing," where young men compete in games of strength and skill for maidens' affections. Mirri has until this point elected not to take part in the Choosing, but when Tamar arrives, she announces she will choose a man. Rajaswami, after finding Tamar, reminds him that he should never challenge a lesser opponent; therefore, they leave at first light without Tamar being part of the Choosing. On the road through the forest, they reunite with Hashkat and are saved by Mirri when she discovers them stuck in thornbushes' cement-like sap. Mirri joins the party and travels north.

Another companion is found in Garuda, a pessimistic eagle whose nests Tamar has accidentally destroyed twice. Garuda was once the messenger of a King Jaya whose job it was to retrieve a ruby with a lotus carved on it. This is the same jewel Tamar carries! Garuda agrees to come with the group to look after the ruby because he is in no shape to fly well (he is referred to as a buzzard before his true species is known). They continue north to a clearing where they meet Kana, a ruthless general of the kingdom of Ranapura who obeys no code of conduct. He and his men set upon Tamar in an unfair matchup, but the group is saved by Ashwara, exiled king of Ranapura.

Ashwara tells how his cousin Nahusha has usurped the throne and exiled Ashwara and his brothers. Suddenly a suta (royal crier) named Adi-Kavi emerges from an anthill and joins the party. They decide to travel north to Muktara to plead with the king, Bala, for intervention. Tamar declares that this mission is more important than his mission to Mahapura because treachery is a matter of supreme dishonor.

=== Part II: In the Forest ===
The party arrives in Muktara to engage in durbar with King Bala, only to find that Nahusha is already there. There is nearly a violent confrontation between Ashwara and Nahusha, before Bala restores order to the durbar. Nahusha is a hateful man with no respect for anyone save himself, not even for the revered brahmana. He reveals that one of Hashkat's faithful subjects, Akka, has been captured and cruelly enslaved for Nahusha's amusement. Finally, Bala reaches the decision that he will take neither side in the struggle, giving neither military support to Nahusha nor protection to Ashwara.

They leave the city cautiously, as Bala has warned Ashwara that Nahusha will only be unable to harm him inside Muktara, and are charged by a large talking elephant named Arvati, who ran into them while fleeing from her captors. Adi-Kavi has a plan for dealing with the approaching soldiers who are trying to recapture Arvati. He ties up Hashkat and paints him with mud. When the hunters arrive, Adi-Kavi claims that the elephant was actually a demonic rakshasa. He gets them to fall into a net trap to avoid being killed by the false demon.

== See also ==
- Mythology
- Indian epic poetry
- Vedic mythology
- Hindu mythology
- Buddhist mythology
