= Vesper Holly =

Recurring novel protagonist

Vesper Holly is the protagonist in a series of novels by Lloyd Alexander. She is a young high-society orphan from Philadelphia, the daughter of an eccentric wealthy archaeologist who disappeared while on an expedition to the Balkan state of Illyria. Vesper is looked after by her guardians, Uncle Brinnie and Aunt Mary.

Vesper is young and wild—not at all the proper Victorian schoolgirl. Alexander describes her as having "the digestive talents of a goat and the mind of a chess master. She is familiar with half a dozen languages and can swear fluently in all of them."

== Publications ==
She is the main character in the following books.

- The Illyrian Adventure (1986)
- The El Dorado Adventure (1987)
- The Drackenberg Adventure (1988)
- The Jedera Adventure (1989)
- The Philadelphia Adventure (1990)
- The Xanadu Adventure (2005)

== Reception ==
Orson Scott Card reviewed The Illyrian Adventure favorably, saying "It is the stuff that dreams are made of. I wish I had had this book when I was twelve. I was delighted to read it even now when I'm old."
