= Napoli Film Festival =

Annual film festival in Naples, Italy

The Napoli Film Festival is a film festival that takes place every year since 1997 in Naples.

== Description ==
Founded with the name Modfest - 360° of Cinema of the Italian Union Circoli del Cinema (U.I.C.C.), it was conceived by Mario Violini, and takes place every year in Naples, at Castel Sant'Elmo, generally in June.

The review is part of the european circuit of the most important independent festivals, relaunching its cinematographic "double track": presenting to the public unpublished works in Italy by mediterranean directors and neapolitan authors, without forgetting the charm of the great Hollywood cinema.

Among the guests of the latest editions, organized by Pappi Corsicato, there are Ferzan Özpetek, Margherita Buy, Rosaria De Cicco, Michele Placido, Paola Cortellesi, Cinzia Mirabella, the brothers Joel and Ethan Coen and Frances McDormand. The scenographies, from the fifth edition (2003) onwards, were signed and created by Francesco Davide and Renato Delehaye.

Since 2012 the organization of the festival has moved from Castel Sant'Elmo to other structures in the city of Naples, such as the Metropolitan cinema, the Vittoria cinema, the French Language Institute and the Academy of Fine Arts of Naples.

Starting from the 15th edition (2013) the Napoli Film Festival introduces the competitive section ScreenNapoliWeb, dedicated to web series made in Campania or by campanian authors. The first two editions of the competition are won by Ferdinando Carcavallo, the first time for the Travel Companions Series, the second (2014) for Fratelli Katano.

== Bibliography ==
- "Napoli Film Festival a Castel Sant'Elmo dal 13 al 18 ottobre 2011 Napoli Film Festival 2011". napolitoday.it (in Italian).
