= Runaway Brain =

1995 Mickey Mouse cartoon

- European theatrical release poster with A Goofy Movie
- Directed by: Chris Bailey
- Story by: Tim Hauser
- Produced by: Ron Tippe
- Starring: Wayne Allwine; Russi Taylor; Kelsey Grammer; Jim Cummings; Bill Farmer
- Music by: John Debney
- Animation by: Andreas Deja; Gary Dunn; Sylvain Deboissy
- Color process: Technicolor
- Production company: Walt Disney Feature Animation
- Distributed by: Buena Vista Pictures Distribution
- Release date: August 11, 1995; (with A Kid in King Arthur's Court)
- Running time: 7 minutes
- Country: United States
- Language: English

Runaway Brain is a 1995 American animated comedy horror short film produced by Walt Disney Feature Animation. Featuring Mickey Mouse and Minnie Mouse, the short centers on the former attempting to earn money to pay for an anniversary gift for Minnie. He responds to an advertisement to work for chimpanzee mad scientist Doctor Frankenollie, only to find out that he is looking for a donor to switch brains with the monster he created. Featuring animation by animator Andreas Deja, it was first released in 1995 attached to North American theatrical showings of A Kid in King Arthur's Court and in 1996 attached to international theatrical showings of A Goofy Movie (1995). It would be the final original Mickey Mouse theatrical animated short until Get a Horse! in 2013.

The short received mixed reviews from audiences. It was nominated for the Academy Award for Best Animated Short Film at the 68th Academy Awards. Later references to the cartoon have been made in Disney related media, such as the video game Kingdom Hearts 3D: Dream Drop Distance.

== Plot ==
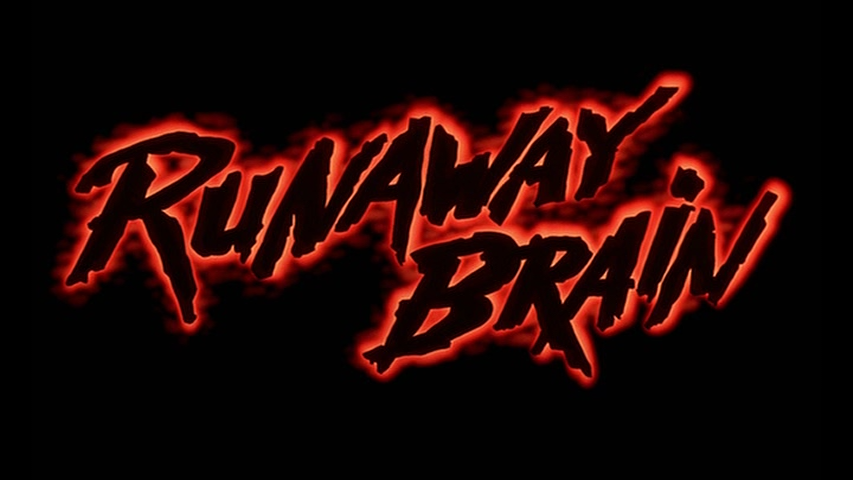
The short's title card

On a dark and stormy evening, Minnie Mouse arrives at Mickey Mouse's house and discovers that he has forgotten about the anniversary of their first date. Mickey then comes up with the last-minute idea to take her to a miniature golf course and shows her a newspaper advertisement for it, but she instead notices another ad for a trip to Hawaii, which is overpriced, and mistakes it for the gift. After Minnie leaves, Mickey panics over how he can make that much money when Pluto shows him the want ads and Mickey sees one from chimpanzee mad scientist Doctor Frankenollie to earn the amount of money that he needs for "a mindless day's work". Upon arriving at Frankenollie's residence, Mickey is dropped down a trapdoor into the scientist's laboratory, where he reveals his plan to switch his donor's brain with that of his enormous Pete-resembling monster, Julius. Although the experiment takes Frankenollie's life, it is a success nonetheless, as Mickey and Julius' brains are switched.

In his new body, Julius finds Mickey's wallet and notices a photograph of Minnie, with whom he instantly becomes smitten. He escapes from the laboratory and finds Minnie while she is shopping for swimsuits. After Minnie immediately mistakes Julius for Mickey, the latter arrives to save her. Minnie is initially terrified of him due to the appearance of Julius' body, but Mickey convinces her of who he is and places her on the top of a skyscraper for safety. As Julius continues to pursue Minnie and a battle between him and Mickey occurs, they land on a telephone line and become electrocuted, sending their brains back into their proper bodies. Continuing their fight at the skyscraper where Minnie is, Mickey manages to subdue Julius using a billboard advertising the trip to Hawaii there and save her. The couple eventually travel to Hawaii together on an inflatable boat pulled by Julius, who is goaded by Mickey into chasing after the photograph of Minnie in his wallet.

== Voice cast ==
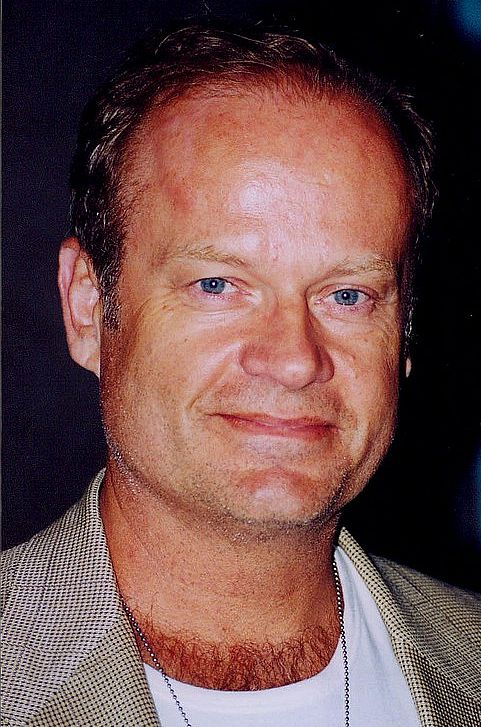
Kelsey Grammer voices mad scientist Doctor Frankenollie.

- Wayne Allwine as Mickey Mouse
- Russi Taylor as Minnie Mouse
- Kelsey Grammer as Doctor Frankenollie
- Jim Cummings as Julius
- Bill Farmer as Pluto

== Production ==
After Disney celebrated Mickey Mouse's 60th anniversary in 1988, Mickey starred in the featurette The Prince and the Pauper, which was directed by George Scribner and released in theaters with The Rescuers Down Under in 1990. The Rescuers Down Under however failed at the box office, so a new project was sought for the character. The director of Runaway Brain, Chris Bailey recalled: "If you were a director or part of the development, if you were between assignments, you were asked to develop Mickey shorts". Bailey at first saw approval from studio president Jeffrey Katzenberg and Disney Animation executives Thomas Schumacher and Peter Schneider regarding the rework of an idea he had for a Roger Rabbit short, Tourist Trap, with Mickey and Donald Duck heading on a vacation and Donald attempting to murder Mickey, but after a failed storyboard screening, Bailey received permission from Roy E. Disney to develop another short idea, Runaway Brain.

Jim Beihold was assigned to layout, Ian Gooding served as art director and Andreas Deja, who had animated Scar in The Lion King (1994), developed Julius while in Mickey's body based on Bailey's sketches. Disney Animation France, who was just finishing A Goofy Movie (1995), was given the animation job. While the crew was in France, Katzenberg left Disney, leaving Bailey without the executive who most supported his ideas. While the first screening of the mostly completed short to the executives was successful, Schumacher and Schneider went on to order many changes that would cut scenes and require others to be newly animated. These included not having Julius drooling while looking at Minnie, changing Mickey's electrocution to be more cartoonish and having the ending with Julius chasing an "effigy Minnie" made of pillows replaced with having him pursue the wallet photograph.

== Cultural references ==
The beginning of the cartoon shows Mickey playing a Snow White-based satirical take on fighting games, which depicts a match between Dopey and Queen Grimhilde in her peddler disguise. Director Chris Bailey said that it was Jeffrey Katzenberg who suggested a scene with a video game, Bailey came up with the fighting game after his idea of a first-person shooter based on Bambi (1942) was rejected. The general plot of the cartoon refers back to Mary Shelley's Frankenstein, with Doctor Frankenollie and Julius being heavily inspired by the titular character and his monster, respectively. The composite name "Frankenollie" comes from the names of animators Frank Thomas and Ollie Johnston, who were two of Disney's Nine Old Men.

Mickey's wallet contains a photograph of him from Steamboat Willie (1928). In addition, Mickey whistles the short's primary theme, Steamboat Bill, before he is dropped down into Frankenollie's laboratory and a Polynesian-styled rendition of it additionally plays during the credits. The wallet additionally features a library card from the fictional 'Guillard County Library', a reference to Stuart Gillard.

Zazu from The Lion King (1994) briefly appears twice; once when Mickey is dropped down into the lab and again when Julius roars at him.

One of the objects seen during Mickey's descent into the lab is a pink slip with "J.K." on it. This is a reference to Katzenberg, who left Disney in 1994 and went on to form rival studio DreamWorks Pictures with Steven Spielberg and David Geffen.

== Release and reception ==
In terms of general reception, the macabre nature of the animation's plot brought criticism from some Disney fans due to the contrast with the previously light tone of Mickey Mouse cartoons. Andy Mooney, then chairman of Disney's consumer products unit, remarked to the Los Angeles Times in 2003 that "the very fact that Mickey was possessed was very disturbing" to some audiences, though the character "overcomes that".

The film was screened out of competition at the 1996 Cannes Film Festival. It was first released in North America on August 11, 1995, alongside theatrical showings of A Kid in King Arthur's Court, then on September 12, 1996, with The Hunchback of Notre Dame in Australia and on October 18, 1996, attached to A Goofy Movie in the UK. The short was to be re-released with 101 Dalmatians, which was sent to theaters with the short attached in 1996, but Disney asked theater owners to cut the short off all film prints and replace it with trailers for then upcoming Disney films. In addition, the short was released with theatrical screenings of George of the Jungle in 1997.

The cartoon was nominated the Academy Award for Best Animated Short Film at the 68th Academy Awards.

== Home media ==
The short was released on May 18, 2004 on Walt Disney Treasures: Mickey Mouse in Living Color, Volume Two: 1939-Today.

It is additionally available as a Movies Anywhere-exclusive digital download with the Walt Disney Animation Studios Short Films Collection (but is not included on the Blu-Ray/DVD disc set).

It was additionally released on Super 8 film by Derann Film Services.

== In other media ==
- Julius appears as an optional secret boss in Kingdom Hearts 3D: Dream Drop Distance in Traverse Town.
- A newspaper clipping of Doctor Frankenollie's advertisement is inside of the ticket booth of the El CapiTOON Theater at Disneyland, which houses the Mickey & Minnie's Runaway Railway attraction.

== See also ==
- Mickey Mouse (film series)
