= George Scribner =

American film director

- Born: September 28, 1952 (age 74); Panama City, Panama
- Occupations: Artist, director and animator

George Scribner (born September 28, 1952) is an artist, director and animator whose credits include the 1988 Walt Disney Animation Studios film Oliver & Company.

== Biography ==
Scribner was born and raised in the Republic of Panama, where he attended grade schools and drew his way through most of his classes. After attending The Bolles School in Florida, he majored in film at Emerson College in Boston and moved to Los Angeles to pursue animation and joined Hanna-Barbera Productions. He became an animator at Walt Disney Feature Animation in the mid-1980s and it is in 1988 that he directed Oliver & Company. He also directed the featurette The Prince and the Pauper, starring Mickey Mouse in a duo role playing both himself and the Prince. After working on numerous other features, he was originally going to co-direct The Lion King.

He worked as a director on an early version of the Pomp and Circumstance sequence for Fantasia 2000 where Donald Duck was to deliver jewel to the children of the Princes and Princesses of the Disney films. The idea was shelved. While working at Hanna-Barbera he was story director on The Smurfs, The Biskitts, Challenge of the GoBots and Rock Odyssey. He recently appeared in the 2010 documentary film Waking Sleeping Beauty.

He is currently an animation contractor for Walt Disney Imagineering where he has directed Mickey's PhilharMagic (uncredited), Disneyland: The First 50 Magical Years and Magic Lamp Theatre (Tokyo).

Scribner is also an accomplished painter who is known for painting ocean scenes. Scribner recently completed documenting the expansion of the Panama Canal through a series of paintings that capture both the magnitude of the project as well as the unique culture and stories of the people of Panama.

== Filmography ==
=== Television ===
| Year | Title | Role | Notes |
|---|---|---|---|
| 1980 | Bugs Bunny's Bustin' Out All Over | Assistant animator | TV special |
| 1981 | ABC Weekend Specials | Animator | Episode: "The Puppy Saves the Circus" |
| 1981 | Trollkins | Animator | |
| 1981 | The Richie Rich/Scooby-Doo Show | Animator | |
| 1981 | The Smurfs | Animator | |
| 1981 | The Kwicky Koala Show | Animator | |
| 1981 | A Chipmunk Christmas | TV special | |
| 1983 | The Biskitts | Layout artist | |
| 1984 | The Transformers | Storyboard artist | |
| 1985 | Challenge of the GoBots | Story director | |
| 1985–1987 | CBS Storybreak | Storyboard designer | |

=== Film ===
| Year | Title | Role | Notes |
|---|---|---|---|
| 1981 | American Pop | Animator | |
| 1981 | Heavy Metal | Animator | segment: "Taarna" |
| 1982 | Heidi's Song | Character animator | |
| 1985 | The Black Cauldron | Animator | |
| 1987 | Rock Odyssey | Animator | TV film |
| 1988 | Oliver & Company | Director | |
| 1990 | The Prince and the Pauper | Director | Featurette |
| 1994 | The Lion King | Additional story material | |
| 2003 | Mickey's PhilharMagic | Director; Producer | 4D Disney Parks attraction |
| 2009 | Waking Sleeping Beauty | Himself | Documentary |
