= The Frisco Kid =

1979 film by Robert Aldrich

- Theatrical release poster
- Directed by: Robert Aldrich
- Written by: Michael Elias; Frank Shaw; Gene Wilder (uncredited)
- Produced by: Mace Neufeld
- Starring: Gene Wilder; Harrison Ford
- Cinematography: Robert B. Hauser
- Edited by: Jack Horger; Irving Rosenblum; Maury Winetrobe
- Music by: Frank De Vol
- Distributed by: Warner Bros. Pictures
- Release date: July 13, 1979
- Running time: 119 minutes
- Country: United States
- Languages: English; Yiddish; Hebrew
- Budget: $9.2 million
- Box office: $9.3 million

The Frisco Kid is a 1979 American Western comedy film directed by Robert Aldrich, starring Gene Wilder as Avram Belinski, a Polish rabbi who is traveling to San Francisco, and Harrison Ford as a bank robber who befriends him.

== Plot ==
Rabbi Avram Belinski, newly graduated at the bottom of his class from a Polish yeshiva, arrives in Philadelphia en route to San Francisco where he will be a congregation's new rabbi. He has with him a Torah scroll for the San Francisco synagogue. Avram, an innocent, trusting, and inexperienced traveler, falls in with three con men, the brothers Matt and Darryl Diggs and their partner Mr. Jones, who trick him into helping pay for a wagon and supplies to go west, then brutally rob him and leave him and most of his belongings scattered along a deserted road in Pennsylvania.

Still determined to make it to San Francisco, Avram, on foot and exhausted, comes upon a colony of Amish people. From their simple black clothing, he assumes they are fellow Hasidic Jews, until he notices a Christian cross on the Bible carried in the pocket of one of the men, at which point he faints. They take care of Avram and collect enough money to get him a train ticket. In Ohio, Avram works on the railroad until he saves up enough money to buy a horse and some supplies.

On his way west again, he is befriended and looked after by a stranger named Tommy Lillard, a bank robber with a soft heart who is moved by Avram's helplessness and frank personality, despite the trouble these usually give him. When Tommy robs a bank on a Friday, Avram will not ride a horse on the Sabbath even with a hanging posse on their trail. The two also experience Native American customs and hospitality, encounter freezing snowy weather, and disrupt a Trappist monastery's vow of silence with an innocent gesture of gratitude.

While stopping in a small town not too far from San Francisco, Avram again meets the Diggs brothers and Jones. He gets into a fight with the three of them and, after taking a beating, is rescued by Tommy, who takes back what they had stolen from Avram and more besides. Later, Avram is dismayed when Tommy announces that they will be parting ways. The three bandits follow the pair and ambush them on a beach where they have stopped to bathe. Tommy shoots Jones dead and grazes Matt, who flees the scene. Avram is forced to kill Darryl in self-defense.

In San Francisco, Avram begins to doubt whether he is qualified to be a rabbi, not only because he killed a man, but because he rushed to save the Torah over saving Tommy, who has become his best friend. Tommy restores his faith, reminding him that he still is what he is inside, despite what he had to do on the beach. However, Matt, the sole survivor of the ambushing trio, appears and challenges Avram to duel. Avram, regaining his composure, shows his wisdom and courage in front of the entire community by disarming and exiling him from San Francisco with Tommy's help. The film ends with Avram marrying not the elder daughter, to whom he had been betrothed sight unseen by her father, but Rosalie Bender, the younger daughter with whom he had fallen in love at first sight, with Tommy as his best man.

== Cast ==
- Gene Wilder as Avram Belinski
- Harrison Ford as Tommy Lillard
- Ramon Bieri as Mr. Jones
- Val Bisoglio as Chief Gray Cloud
- George Ralph DiCenzo as Darryl Diggs
- Leo Fuchs as Chief Rabbi
- Penny Peyser as Rosalie Bender
- William Smith as Matt Diggs
- Jack Somack as Samuel Bender
- Beege Barkette as Sarah Mindl Bender
- Shay Duffin as O'Leary
- Walter Janowitz as Old Amish Man
- Frank De Vol as The Red Dog Piano Player
- Joe Kapp as Paco Monterano
- Clyde Kusatsu as Mr. Ping
- Cliff Pellow as Mr. Daniels
- Eda Reiss Merin as Mrs. Bender
- Vincent Schiavelli as Brother Bruno
- Ian Wolfe as Father Joseph
- Martin Garner as The Rabbi
- David Bradley as Julius Rosensheine

== Production ==
=== Development ===
The film was in development for seven years. It was known as No Knife for a long time, then briefly as Greenhorn before someone suggested The Frisco Kid.

Robert Aldrich replaced director Dick Richards during pre-production. Roger Ebert wrote, "It's really nobody's movie. The screenplay has been around Hollywood for several years, and Aldrich seems to have taken it on as a routine assignment."

According to Gene Wilder's autobiography, Kiss Me Like a Stranger: My Search for Love and Art, the Tommy Lillard role, played by Harrison Ford, was originally planned for John Wayne. John J. Puccio of Movie Metropolis writes that Wayne was "eager to take it on as a comic follow-up to True Grit and Rooster Cogburn. Salary concerns nixed the idea, though, and it's questionable he would have finished the shooting, in any case, as he died shortly before The Frisco Kid opened." (Another source says Wayne did not want to make the film due to "vulgarity" in the script.)

Wilder said he was offered the film in 1976 but turned it down. The script was rewritten, he read it again the following year and thought it was better but still turned it down. However, when he read a revised second draft he agreed to do it. Warner Bros. asked him to work on the script, so he helped with the construction of a third draft, then wrote a fourth draft.

=== Production ===
Filming started 30 October 1978 under the working title No Knife. After rehearsal, principal photography began in Greeley, Colorado and then moved to AZ near the town of Nogales and the San Rafael Valley, additionally in Tucson, Arizona, Saguaro National Monument, Texas Canyon, El Capitán State Beach and Lake Tahoe, Nevada.

Aldrich said, "With the exception of Bette Davis, Gene is the best actor I've worked with. He's very intuitive, very bright." Wilder also enjoyed working with Aldrich, calling the film Young Frankenstein Meets the Dirty Dozen and saying "the way he chooses to do a scene is the most artistic of any director I've ever worked with."

Aldrich did not always get on with Harrison Ford during the shoot. "I think every time Aldrich looked at Harrison, he saw John Wayne," said Mace Neufeld, the producer. "Harrison was aware of that, but he was always fun to be around, very funny." Ford later said "It was fun to work with Gene... [but] every time the director, Robert Aldrich, looked at me, he was thinking about how unhappy he was that he didn't have John Wayne, instead."

== Reception ==
=== Box office ===
The film earned $4.7 million at the US box office in its first year.

=== Critical response ===
On review aggregation website Rotten Tomatoes the film has a 54% rating based on 28 reviews. The consensus summarizes: "Not even a genial Gene Wilder or a dashing Harrison Ford can rescue The Frisco Kid from a monotonous procession of gently comedic sketches that never cohere into a memorable yarn."

Vincent Canby of The New York Times described The Frisco Kid as "harmless chaos": "People keep coming and going and doing ferociously cute things, but never anything that could appeal to anyone except a close relative or someone with a built-in weakness for anything ethnic whatsoever." He criticized the lack of plot development, saying that, while based on a clever idea, The Frisco Kid ultimately fails to deliver on its promise.

Roger Ebert gave the movie a mixed review, admitting that after seeing Cat Ballou he was "forever after spoiled on the subject of comic Westerns." "The movie's based on a good idea, yes... But what approach do you take to this material? What's your comic tone? The Frisco Kid tries for almost every possible tone."

Jordan Hiller called it one of "25 Essential Jewish Movies", praising its "uncommon innocence and unselfconscious humility." He called it an "unpredictably paced part screwball comedy farce, part dramatic buddy picture, part spaghetti western" and wrote, "The Frisco Kid has the feel of an artist's charmingly naive youthful indiscretion... The Frisco Kid is, all pratfalls and tuchus jokes aside, the quintessential 'Torah' movie." Reviewer Ken Hanke wrote, "Robert Aldrich's penultimate film is an easygoing work of some considerable charm that relies far too much on ethnic humor — mostly Jewish, but not entirely — to sit quite as comfortably as it might like... [Aldrich's] professionalism serves the film well. It's very hard to fault on a technical level, and he brings a strong visual sense to bear on a number of sequences that raise them several notches above the TV flavor of the material. The dance sequence, when Avram and his unlikely companion, Tommy (Harrison Ford), are prisoners of a tribe of Indians, is a good case in point, as is the final shoot-out in the streets of San Francisco... Never a great movie, it's nonetheless a pleasant one — an old-fashioned entertainment that more than gets by on the unforced (albeit unlikely) chemistry of Wilder and Ford."

Puccio of Movie Metropolis called the film "humorous and touching" and "uplifting as well": "The Frisco Kid is not a great film; it's not even a very good film by the best filmmaking standards; but it's such a sweet and gentle film, it's hard not to like... The film moseys along at a leisurely pace, and the director has a little difficulty finding the right comedic tone between dry, subtle farce and outright slapstick; yet it manages to find a soft spot in the heart for every scene, so maybe 'heartwarming' is what Aldrich had in mind, in which case he couldn't have done better."

Wilder's performance was widely praised. Ebert wrote, "What's poignant about the film is that Wilder's performance is such a nice one. He's likable, plucky, versatile. He is, in fact, as good an actor here as he's ever been before, and at his own brand of complex vulnerability Gene Wilder has never been surpassed." Hanke said, "But the main interest in the film is probably Gene Wilder's performance, which is interesting simply because it's one of the few times that Wilder played a character that wasn't essentially Gene Wilder. And, lo and behold, he does a perfectly credible job of being someone else — or at least someone else who isn't Willy Wonka." Film scholar Stuart Galbraith IV declares that Wilder gives "one of his very best performances" and calls his character "incredibly endearing": "The Frisco Kid is a real surprise, offering as it does one of Gene Wilder's best characterizations in a film that's alternately funny and sweetly touching, this despite Robert Aldrich's generally indelicate direction." Puccio wrote, "Nobody does nice like Gene Wilder... Nor have many actors been so willing to celebrate their culture and religious convictions as Wilder does here, perhaps also a trait he picked up from [Mel] Brooks."
