= Chris Bailey (animator) =

American animator and film director

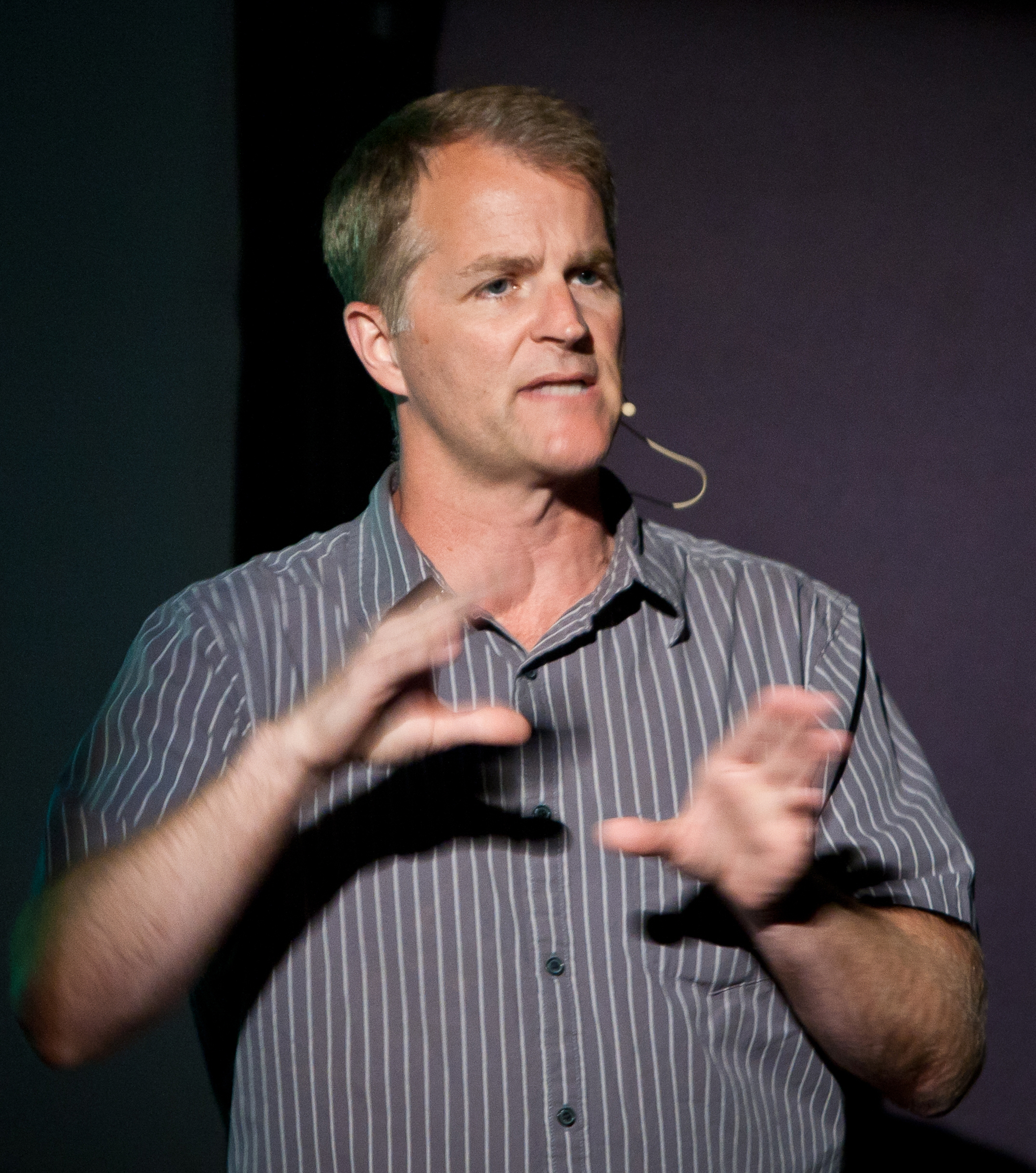
- Chris Bailey visits Vancouver Film School in July 2011
- Born: March 26, 1962 (age 64); Portland, Oregon, U.S.
- Occupations: Animator, film director
- Years active: 1985–present

Chris Bailey (born March 26, 1962) is an American animator and film director.

== Early life and career ==
Bailey was born in Portland, Oregon on March 26, 1962.

He went to high school at Reynolds High School, and later attended California Institute of the Arts. He worked at Disney as an animator for The Great Mouse Detective (1986) Sport Goofy in Soccermania (1987), Oliver & Company (1988), The Little Mermaid (1989), The Rescuers Down Under (1990), The Lion King (1994), and Hercules (1997). He also animated the children for the World Chorus post-show area for It's a Small World at Disneyland Paris.

Prior to Disney, Bailey worked with Don Bluth on the Space Ace and Dragon's Lair video games and also on Starchaser: The Legend of Orin. He became one of the first traditional animators to adapt to computer graphics.

He directed the animation for Paula Abdul's Opposites Attract music video, the 1995 Mickey Mouse cartoon, Runaway Brain, which was screened out of competition at the 1996 Cannes Film Festival, the 3D theme park attraction It's Tough to Be a Bug! located at Disney's Animal Kingdom and Disney California Adventure, and the television series Kim Possible.

He served as animation director for Garfield: The Movie, Garfield: A Tail of Two Kitties, Alvin and the Chipmunks, and 2 Stupid Dogs, supervising producer and supervising director for Clerks: The Animated Series and animation supervisor for Inspector Gadget, Mighty Joe Young, Fat Albert and X2.

Major Damage, Bailey's animated short, was posted on his YouTube channel on October 28, 2016. Back in 2001, Major Damage was a groundbreaking achievement because of his use of the Internet to collaborate with other artists and contributors.

== Selected filmography ==
=== As director ===
- Runaway Brain (1995)
- It's Tough to Be a Bug! (1998)
- Clerks: The Animated Series (TV Series, six episodes, 2000–2001)
- Major Damage (2001)
- Kim Possible (TV Series, Season 1) (also dialogue director)
- Lady D (2008)
- Lefty (2008)
- Georgy (2008)
- Sean (2008)
- Judy M.D.: Super Surgeon (2008)
- Phil's Dance Party (2012)
- Paws of Fury: The Legend of Hank (2022) (co-director)
- The Great Wolf Pack: A Call to Adventure (2022)

=== As animator ===
- Starchaser: The Legend of Orin (1985) (computer animation planner, assistant animator)
- The Great Mouse Detective (1986) (character animator, uncredited)
- Sport Goofy in Soccermania (1987) (animator)
- Technological Threat (1988) (character animator)
- Oliver & Company (1988) (character animator and story writer)
- Bugs Bunny's Wild World of Sports (TV 1989)
- The Little Mermaid (1989) (character animator)
- The Rescuers Down Under (1990) (character animator)
- Dragon's Lair II (1991) (animator)
- Hocus Pocus (1993) (Cat animation supervisor)
- The Lion King (1994) (additional animator)
- Hercules (1997) (animator: "Nessus")
- Garfield: The Movie (2004) (animation supervisor)
- Garfield: A Tail of Two Kitties (2006) (animation supervisor)
- Alvin and the Chipmunks (2007) (animation director)
- Alvin and the Chipmunks: The Squeakquel (2009) (animation director)
- Hop (2011) (senior animation supervisor)
- Tom and Jerry in New York (TV Series, animation supervisor, 2021)

=== As executive producer ===
- Kim Possible (TV Series, Season 1)

=== As producer ===
- Scooby-Doo and Guess Who? (TV Series, 2019–2021)

== Awards and nominations ==
- 1996 Oscar nomination, Academy Award for Best Animated Short Film for Runaway Brain (1995)
- 2003 Primetime Emmy Award nomination, Outstanding Animated Program (For Programming Less Than One Hour) for Kim Possible: Crush (2003)
