= Vance Gerry =

American storyboard artist, concept artist, and character designer

- Born: Vance Bryden Gerry; August 21, 1929; Pasadena, California, U.S.
- Died: March 5, 2005 (aged 75); Pasadena, California, U.S.
- Education: Chouinard Art Institute
- Occupations: Layout artist; storyboard artist; concept artist; character designer; letterpress printmaker
- Years active: 1955–2004
- Spouse: Mary Palmer

Vance Bryden Gerry (August 21, 1929 – March 5, 2005) was an American storyboard artist, concept artist, and character designer known for his work on One Hundred and One Dalmatians (1961), The Sword in the Stone (1963), The Jungle Book (1967), The Aristocats (1970), The Rescuers (1977), and The Lion King (1994). He also operated his own letterpress printing business called Weather Bird Press.

== Biography ==
Gerry was born in Pasadena, California. A self-described poor student, he attended University School in Pasadena to complete his high school studies. There, he stated, "Teachers usually liked my artwork in grammar school, watercolors and crayons and so on. So I had sort of always thought that I would be a commercial artist." Gerry then enrolled in Woodbury College and attended Art Center School for less than one semester before he was drafted into the United States Army. He served as a corporal during the Korean War and left in 1952.

Following his military service, Gerry studied at the Chouinard Art Institute on a scholarship from the G.I. Bill. One of his teachers there was Donald W. Graham, who had taught animation training and orientation classes at Walt Disney Productions during the 1930s. He attended there for two and a half years. Realizing he would not make it professionally as an illustrator, Gerry was persuaded by his friend, Grant Dahlstrom, to work for him as a salesman. Graham, instead, recommended that he should work for Walt Disney Productions. In 1955, Gerry first worked as an assistant in-betweener. He then transitioned to being a layout artist in which he worked on One Hundred and One Dalmatians (1961) and The Sword in the Stone (1963). During the development on The Jungle Book (1967), he began working in the story department.

Meanwhile, Gerry began his printmaking career in 1963, in which he founded the Peach Pit Press. Five years later, his wife suggested changing the name to the Weather Bird Press, which he operated in Laguna Beach, California. Back at Disney, Gerry returned to doing layout artwork for The Rescuers (1977) and The Fox and the Hound (1981) before leaving to continue running his letterpress printing business in 1977. He briefly returned to Disney for The Black Cauldron (1985) where he created early designs for the Horned King. Gerry envisioned him as a big-bellied Viking who had a red beard, fiery temper, and wore a steel helmet with two large horns. He left the studio again, but returned to work on The Great Mouse Detective (1986). By the 1990s, Gerry worked one day a week on the studio's in-development projects, in which he contributed visual development and character design artwork on The Lion King (1994), Pocahontas (1995), The Hunchback of Notre Dame (1996), Tarzan (1999), and Home on the Range (2004).

Describing his working method, Gerry stated, "It doesn't take much to get started. I'd just as soon start with a title of a picture and just start dreaming into it. A script is restricting because it tells you too much. I'd rather start earlier than that and look for possibilities for animation and entertainment, rather than story elements or structure." Towards the end of his career, he worked closely with fellow storyboard artists Joe Grant and Burny Mattinson. Gerry retired from Disney to continue working at Weather Bird Press with his longtime friend Patrick Reagh.

== Death and legacy ==
On March 5, 2005, Gerry died at the age of 75 from complications of cancer in Pasadena, California.

Commemorating his passing, Don Hahn stated: "He was a writer's writer and his sense of storytelling and influence on all of us was profound." Floyd Norman, who had worked alongside Gerry during the 1950s and 1960s, wrote the following: "His whole approach to Disney story telling was so uncomplicated. In an era when young story artists pontificate endlessly about their story telling prowess, Vance was an intuitive story teller who seem to allow the story to flow out of him."

== Filmography ==
Year	Film	Position	Notes
1955–1957	Walt Disney's Disneyland	Layout artist	4 episodes
1957	The Truth About Mother Goose (Short)	Layout artist	
1959	Donald in Mathmagic Land (Short)	Layout artist	
1960	Goliath II (Short)	Layout artist	
1961	Aquamania (Short)	Story	
1961	One Hundred and One Dalmatians	Layout artist	
1963	The Sword in the Stone	Layout artist	
1966	Winnie the Pooh and the Honey Tree (Short)	Story	
1967	The Jungle Book	Story	
1968	Winnie the Pooh and the Blustery Day (Short)	Story	
1970	The Aristocats	Story	
1971	Bedknobs and Broomsticks	Animation story	Uncredited
1973	Robin Hood	Story sequences	
1977	The Many Adventures of Winnie the Pooh	Story	
1977	The Rescuers	Story	
1978	The Small One (Short)	Story	
1981	The Fox and the Hound	Story	
1985	The Black Cauldron	Story	
1986	Disney Family Album	Himself	Episode: "The Storymen"
1986	The Great Mouse Detective	Story adapted by	
1988	Oliver & Company	Story	
1990	The Prince and the Pauper (Short)	Storyboard artist	
1990	The Rescuers Down Under	Storyboard artist	
1991	Beauty and the Beast	Special thanks	
1994	The Lion King	Visual development artist Character designer	Uncredited
1995	Pocahontas	Visual development artist Character designer	
1996	The Hunchback of Notre Dame	Visual development artist Character designer	
1997	Hercules	Story	
1999	Tarzan	Visual development artist Character designer	
1999	Fantasia 2000	Conceptual storyboard artist – (segment "The Carnival of the Animals")	
2004	Home on the Range	Additional visual development artist	Final film role
