= Animation photo transfer process =

Type of technique used in animation

The animation photo transfer process (APT process) is a photographic transfer system that can photographically transfer lines or solid blocks of colors onto acetate sheets (cels). A similar process is used to make the stencils for silk screen printing. The process relies on UV-sensitive inks that cure when exposed to light and stick to the plastic sheet, while the ink in the non-exposed areas is chemically removed from the sheet.

== Advantages ==
Compared to the earlier xerography process used by Disney, the lines can be controlled better, and multiple copies can be made quickly. The drawings are photographed on high-contrast sheet film, and these negatives are then exposed onto the cels. A line on an animated character can be in color instead of just black. This is known as self-colored lines. (Xerographic lines were rendered in color too, when colored toners became available.)

== Examples ==
This process was used on Disney's animated features, such as The Fox and the Hound, The Black Cauldron, The Great Mouse Detective, Oliver & Company, and The Little Mermaid.

== See also ==
- The Black Cauldron
- Timeline of CGI in film and television
- Traditional animation
