= Eda Reiss Merin =

American actress (1913–1998)

- Born: July 31, 1913; New York City, U.S.
- Died: March 31, 1998 (aged 84); Los Angeles, California, U.S.
- Occupation: Actress
- Years active: 1931–1995
- Spouse: Samuel Merin
- Children: 1

Eda Reiss Merin (July 31, 1913 – March 31, 1998) was an American stage, film, television, and voice actress. With a career spanning over six decades, she appeared on Broadway, in regional and touring productions, and later in film and television. She was best known to modern audiences for her role as the babysitter Mrs. Sturak in Don't Tell Mom the Babysitter's Dead (1991) and for voicing Orddu, one of the witches, in Disney's animated feature The Black Cauldron (1985).

== Early life ==
Merin was born in New York City in 1913. She made her Broadway debut in 1931 and quickly established herself as a stage actress. She studied acting in New York and later combined performance with teaching, including work at the Seven Arts School in New York and at the Williamstown Summer Theater.

== Career ==
Merin's career began in the 1930s and included a long association with classical and modern drama. She performed at the Oregon Shakespeare Festival in 1954, playing roles such as Gertrude in Hamlet and Mistress Quickly in The Merry Wives of Windsor.

In 1947 she appeared at the San Gabriel Playhouse in a revival of The Mission Play, playing Señora Josefa de Yorba. She was also active in East Coast regional theater, including productions at the Charles Playhouse in Boston.

She acted with Charles Laughton in Bertolt Brecht's Life of Galileo in the 1940s and later in Brecht's The Private Life of the Master Race in New York. She frequently returned to Brecht, appearing in productions of The Plough and the Stars in 1965, where she was praised for her portrayal of Bessie Burgess.

In 1973 she starred in Kenneth H. Brown's Nightlight at the Hartford Stage Company. The following year she returned to the Cincinnati Playhouse in Travellers. She also appeared in Michel Tremblay's Albertine in Five Times at the Off-Main Street Theatre in Los Angeles in 1987.

In 1984, Merin played Hecuba in Euripides’ The Trojan Women at the Will Geer Theatricum Botanicum in Topanga, California, earning critical praise.

Merin appeared in small or uncredited roles in films from the late 1940s through the 1950s, including An Act of Murder (1948), Knock on Any Door (1949), The Lady Gambles (1949), Where the Sidewalk Ends (1950), No Way Out (1950), and It Happens Every Thursday (1953). She had a part in Lili (1953), and later appeared in America America (1963) and The World of Henry Orient (1964).

She gained late-career visibility with roles in Hester Street (1975), The Frisco Kid (1979), and Turner & Hooch (1989). Her best-known screen appearance came as Mrs. Sturak, the strict babysitter who dies early in the comedy Don't Tell Mom the Babysitter's Dead (1991).

Merin's television career was extensive, beginning in the early 1950s. She appeared in anthology series such as Fireside Theatre and Schlitz Playhouse of Stars, and later on DuPont Show of the Month (1959) and East Side West Side (1963). Her later TV credits included Police Story, Baretta, Charlie’s Angels, Family Ties, St. Elsewhere, Mama's Family, Hill Street Blues, Night Court, Highway to Heaven, Mr. Belvedere, Murder, She Wrote, Civil Wars, The Fresh Prince of Bel-Air, ER, and Nurses.

Merin voiced Orddu, one of the three witches, in Disney's animated feature The Black Cauldron (1985).

In addition to her stage and screen work, Merin taught acting at the Seven Arts School in New York and was active at theater festivals such as Oregon Shakespeare and Williamstown Summer Theater.

She was a member of the Academy of Motion Picture Arts and Sciences and of AFTRA.

Since 2005, the Eda Reiss Merin Award has been presented by the American Federation of Television and Radio Artists (AFTRA) Foundation in her honor.

== Personal life ==
Merin was married to Samuel Merin until his death in 1967. She had one daughter, Jennifer, who became a journalist and critic. Merin lived in Manhattan and later Los Angeles. She died in 1998, aged 84.

== Filmography ==
=== Film ===
Year	Title	Role	Notes
1948	An Act of Murder	Woman in Drug Store	Uncredited
1949	Knock on Any Door	Reporter	Uncredited
1949	The Lady Gambles	Casino Patron	Uncredited
1950	Where the Sidewalk Ends	Shirley Klein	Uncredited
1950	No Way Out	Nurse	Uncredited
1951	I Can Get It for You Wholesale	Miss Marks	Uncredited
1951	Flying Leathernecks	Mama Malotke	Uncredited
1953	It Happens Every Thursday	Mrs. Bartlett	Uncredited
1953	Lili	Fruit Peddler	Uncredited
1963	America, America	—	
1964	The World of Henry Orient	—	
1975	Hester Street	Rabbi’s Wife	
1979	The Frisco Kid	Mrs. Bender	
1985	The Black Cauldron	Orddu	Voice role
1989	Turner & Hooch	Mrs. Remington	
1991	Don't Tell Mom the Babysitter's Dead	Mrs. Sturak	
1996	The Pompatus of Love	Older Woman on Plane	

=== Television ===
Year	Title	Role	Notes
1951	Fireside Theatre	—	1 episode
1952	Schlitz Playhouse	—	1 episode
1959	The DuPont Show of the Month	Maria	1 episode
1963	East Side/West Side	Mrs. Kopichek	1 episode
1977	Police Story	Mrs. Pallitente	1 episode
1977	Baretta	Mrs. Goldman	1 episode
1977	Charlie’s Angels	Esther Goldman	1 episode
1979–81	The White Shadow	Mrs. Goldstein / Abner’s Grandmother	2 episodes
1983	Family Ties	Woman at Airport	1 episode
1983	St. Elsewhere	Mrs. Gustas	1 episode
1983	Mama's Family	Mrs. Brennan	1 episode
1982–84	Hill Street Blues	Old Lady / Mrs. Kramer	2 episodes
1985	Night Court	Gertrude Stuckey	1 episode
1986	Highway to Heaven	Maria Malinoff	1 episode
1986	Mr. Belvedere	Woman #3	1 episode
1992	Murder, She Wrote	Dorothy Fremont	1 episode
1992	Civil Wars	Esther Schoenfeld	1 episode
1991	The Fresh Prince of Bel-Air	Mrs. Sweeting	1 episode
1995	ER	Mrs. Heizer	1 episode
1991	Nurses	Mrs. Chase	1 episode
