= The Prince and the Pauper (1990 film) =

1990 Mickey Mouse animated featurette

- Theatrical release poster
- Directed by: George Scribner
- Screenplay by: Gerrit Graham; Sam Graham; Chris Hubbell
- Story by: Roger Allers; Vance Gerry; Kevin Harkey; Kent Holaday; Daan Jippes; Robert Lence; Burny Mattinson; Gary Trousdale; Kirk Wise
- Based on: The Prince and the Pauper by Mark Twain; Mickey Mouse by; Walt Disney; Ub Iwerks
- Produced by: Dan Rounds
- Starring: Wayne Allwine; Bill Farmer; Arthur Burghardt; Charlie Adler; Tony Anselmo
- Narrated by: Roy Dotrice
- Music by: Nicholas Pike
- Production company: Walt Disney Feature Animation
- Distributed by: Buena Vista Pictures Distribution (Note: Distributed by Buena Vista Pictures Distribution through the Walt Disney Pictures banner.)
- Release date: November 16, 1990; (with The Rescuers Down Under)
- Running time: 25 minutes
- Country: United States
- Language: English

The Prince and the Pauper is a 1990 American animated action adventure comedy short film produced by Walt Disney Feature Animation and directed by George Scribner. Featuring the voice of Wayne Allwine as Mickey Mouse, it is based on the 1881 novel of the same name by Mark Twain. It was Disney's final use of the traditional ink-and-paint and camera process for a theatrical product, before the CAPS digital-ink-and-paint process rendered the traditional techniques and equipment obsolete. It is also the final Mickey Mouse short to use the APT process. Some objects, such as the carriage, were created on computers before being printed out on paper and photocopied onto animation cels. The animation was given a watercolor look and based on Disney's style from the late 30s, influenced by Fred Moore.

The film was released on November 16, 1990, as the first animated short produced by Disney to accompany the original release of a Disney animated feature, accompanying the original release of The Rescuers Down Under.

== Plot ==
The story begins in London, England in the mid-16th century when a good and wise king ruled the country with peace and compassion. However, one day, the king fell ill and his greedy captain of the guard, Pete plunders and terrorizes the country for almost a decade in the king's name. One winter day, three beggars, Mickey Mouse, Goofy, and Pluto are trying to get money for some food when Captain Pete's carriage, filled with stolen food, passes. Pluto sees a sausage stand out from the carriage and gives chase, pursuing it into the castle. When Mickey knocks on the door to get his dog back, one of the soldiers opens the door and lets him in, mistaking him for the mouse prince. Pete lectures the soldier for letting anyone in, pointing out where the real prince is: in class with his teacher, Horace Horsecollar and his valet, Donald Duck. The prince hears Pete outside roughly handling Mickey and Pluto, so he orders them to be brought to him right away. Pete kicks Mickey through the door and forces Pluto out of the castle.

While in the palace, Mickey meets the prince, who turns out to be a doppelganger of himself as they are exactly identical in appearance (with the only exception that the prince carries a British accent). The prince tells Mickey that he is bored with his life and convinces the beggar to exchange clothes and roles with each other. Before leaving, the prince reassures Mickey if there are any problems, everyone will recognize the true prince with his royal ring. Disguised as a beggar, the prince tricks Pete into kicking him out of the palace and meets Goofy and Pluto while Mickey is challenged with the prince's studies. However, Pluto senses that the prince isn't his master and leaves. The prince later witnesses a couple of soldiers trying to steal a chicken from Clarabelle Cow and her two children, who explain that the soldiers have taken away their food and belongings ever since the king got ill, making the prince realize that Pete and his men have been slandering the king's name in order to satisfy their need for greed and power. When a carriage with the stolen food goes by, the prince stops it by identifying himself through his royal ring, allowing himself to return the food to the people. Some of Pete's soldiers attempt to stop the prince, thinking that he is an impostor, but the prince escapes with help from Goofy and the villagers.

Upon being informed about the carriage incident by one of his guards, Pete realizes that he cast out the real prince by mistake and that the latter has seen the corruption going on outside. Mickey, still dressed as the prince, is called to see the king, who is now dying. Mickey enters the room of the dying king, who tells him he must take his royal birthright and become his new successor, unaware that who he's talking to isn't his son. Mickey decides to find and inform the prince as quickly as possible, but Pete blackmails Mickey to work for him by threatening to kill a captured Pluto. Meanwhile, the prince hears the bells announcing the death of his father and realizes that he must return immediately to the palace. But Pete captures the prince and locks him and Donald (who, unaware of the switch, recognizes the prince despite his pauper clothes) in jail, where Pete announces his plot to install Mickey as a puppet ruler and have the prince executed during the coronation, thereby allowing Pete to take full control of the kingdom beneath the shadows. Fortunately, Goofy disguises himself as an executioner to help Donald and the prince escape the cell and run to the coronation chamber. While Mickey tries to postpone being crowned by the owl archbishop, the prince arrives and reveals himself and Pete's plot to everyone. The prince engages into a sword fight with Pete while Donald and Goofy free Pluto and entangle Pete's soldiers in a fallen chandelier. Mickey and the prince defeat Pete and his men by having them to fall out of a window, but the archbishop is still confused as he doesn't know whom to crown until Pluto recognizes Mickey. The real prince is crowned the new king, and he happily appoints Mickey (as a new member of the royal court) and Goofy (as the new captain of the guard) while ruling for many years with justice and compassion for all.

== Voice cast ==
- Wayne Allwine as Mickey Mouse / The Prince
- Arthur Burghardt as Captain Pete
- Tony Anselmo as Donald Duck
- Bill Farmer as Goofy / Pluto / Horace Horsecollar / Weasel #1
- Elvia Allman as Clarabelle Cow
- Charlie Adler as Weasel #2 & 3 / The Royal Provisioner / Peasant / Man in Street
- Frank Welker as The King / Archbishop
- Trevor Eyster as Kid #1
- Rocky Krakoff as Kid #2
- Roy Dotrice as The Narrator

== Home media ==
The short was released on VHS several times. The VHS and LaserDisc counterparts were first released in June 1991 as part of the Walt Disney Mini-Classics line. In January 1994, the Disney Favorite Stories line was introduced a couple of months after the discontinuation of the Mini-Classics line and that same date, "The Prince and the Pauper" was one of the first few Disney short films re-issued as part of it.

The short was later released on May 18, 2004 on Walt Disney Treasures: Mickey Mouse in Living Color, Volume Two. It was also released on DVD on April 7, 2009 as Walt Disney Animation Collection Volume 3: The Prince and the Pauper.

The short is available to stream on Disney+.

== See also ==
- Mickey Mouse (film series)
