= The Black Cauldron (film) =

1985 animated Disney film by Ted Berman and Richard Rich

- Theatrical release poster
- Directed by: Ted Berman; Richard Rich
- Story by: David Jonas; Al Wilson; Vance Gerry; Roy Morita; Ted Berman; Peter Young; Richard Rich; Art Stevens; Joe Hale
- Based on: The Book of Three and; The Black Cauldron by; Lloyd Alexander
- Produced by: Joe Hale
- Starring: Grant Bardsley; Susan Sheridan; Freddie Jones; Nigel Hawthorne; Arthur Malet; John Byner; Eda Reiss Merin; Adele Maus-Morey; Billie Hayes; Phil Fondacaro; John Hurt
- Edited by: James Melton; Jim Koford; Armetta Jackson
- Music by: Elmer Bernstein
- Production company: Walt Disney Feature Animation
- Distributed by: Buena Vista Pictures Distribution (Note: Distributed under the Walt Disney Pictures banner, with funding by Silver Screen Partners II.)
- Release date: July 24, 1985
- Running time: 80 minutes
- Country: United States
- Language: English
- Budget: $44 million
- Box office: $21.3 million

The Black Cauldron is a 1985 American animated fantasy adventure film loosely based on the first two books in The Chronicles of Prydain series of novels, and directed by Ted Berman and Richard Rich. Produced by Walt Disney Feature Animation, it stars Grant Bardsley, Susan Sheridan, Freddie Jones, Nigel Hawthorne, Arthur Malet, John Byner, Phil Fondacaro, and John Hurt, with John Huston serving as the narrator for the prologue.

Disney acquired the film rights to the books in 1973, with production beginning in 1980. It was originally scheduled to be released at Christmas 1984, but several scenes, particularly in the film's climax, were found to be disturbing to children during a test screening. The newly appointed Walt Disney Studios chairman Jeffrey Katzenberg ordered the scenes to be cut, which caused its release to be delayed to 1985. It was the first Disney animated film to receive a PG rating, as well as the first Disney animated film to feature computer-generated imagery.

The Black Cauldron was released by Buena Vista Pictures Distribution on July 24, 1985. The film received mixed reviews from critics. Being the most expensive animated film ever made at the time, it was a box-office bomb, grossing just $21 million against a budget of $44 million and putting the future of Disney's animation department in jeopardy. Because of its commercial failure, Disney did not release the film on home media until 1998. It has since gained a cult following.

== Plot ==
In the land of Prydain, Taran, a teenage "assistant pig-keeper" on the farm of Caer Dallben, home of Dallben the Enchanter, dreams of becoming a famous warrior. Dallben learns from the oracular powers of his pig Hen Wen that the evil Horned King is searching for the Black Cauldron, a mystical relic that can create an invincible army of undead warriors known as the Cauldron-Born. Dallben fears the Horned King might use Hen Wen to locate the cauldron, and directs Taran to take the pig to safety, but she is captured by Gwythaints, the Horned King's wyvern-like creatures.

Taran follows them to the Horned King's castle and meets the pestering creature Gurgi, who wants to be his friend. Taran helps Hen Wen escape but is captured and thrown into the dungeon. Another captive named Princess Eilonwy frees him. In the catacombs, the two discover the ancient burial chamber of a king. Taran arms himself with the king's sword, which contains magic that allows him to fight the Horned King's henchmen. Along with a third prisoner, comical bard Fflewddur Fflam, they escape and are found by Gurgi. The Horned King sends the Gwythaints to capture Taran and his friends.

Following Hen Wen's trail, the group stumbles into the underground kingdom of the Fair Folk, who have Hen Wen under their protection. When the kindly King Eidilleg reveals the cauldron's location, Taran decides to destroy it. Eidilleg's obnoxious right-hand man Doli is assigned to lead the friends to the Marshes of Morva while the Fair Folk escort Hen Wen back to Dallben. At Morva, they learn the cauldron is held by three witches—leader Orddu, greedy Orgoch, and benevolent Orwen. Orddu agrees to trade the cauldron for Taran's sword and he reluctantly agrees. The witches reveal the cauldron is indestructible, and its power can only be broken when someone willingly climbs into it, which will kill them. Taran feels foolish for trading the sword for nothing but his companions show their belief in him. They are captured by the Horned King's henchmen and Gurgi flees. The Horned King uses the cauldron to raise the dead and his Cauldron-born army begins to pour out into the world.

Gurgi, deciding not to abandon his friends this time, rescues them. Taran decides to jump into the cauldron to save everyone, but Gurgi jumps in instead, killing the Cauldron-born and himself. The cauldron begins consuming anything within its vicinity. Taran is confronted by the Horned King, who attempts to sacrifice him to the cauldron, only for it to drag the Horned King in and violently rip him apart, which destroys the castle.

The three witches arrive to recover the now-inert Black Cauldron. Having realized Gurgi's true friendship, Taran (with an opportunity provided by Fflewddur) asks them to revive Gurgi in exchange for the cauldron, choosing to give up his sword: Fflewddur challenges the witches into honoring the request and Gurgi is resurrected, much to everyone's joy. Taran and Eilonwy kiss and the four friends journey back to Dallben. Dallben and Doli watch them in a vision created by Hen Wen, and Dallben finally praises Taran for his heroism.

== Voice cast ==
- Grant Bardsley as Taran, a pig-keeper who wants to become a warrior.
- Susan Sheridan as Princess Eilonwy, a virtuous princess who accompanies Taran in his travel.
- Freddie Jones as Dallben, a wizard and Taran's father figure.
- Nigel Hawthorne as Fflewddur Fflam, a bumbling bard who plays the lyre, and accompanies Taran in his travel.
- Arthur Malet as King Eidilleg, the genteel king of the fairies.
- John Byner as Gurgi, a terrier-themed creature of the forest who accompanies Taran in his travel; and Doli, a grumpy fairy who guides Taran's group.
- Phil Fondacaro as Creeper, the Horned King's goblin assistant.
- Eda Reiss Merin as Orddu, one of the three Witches of Morva, acting as the leader of the group.
- Adele Malis-Morey as Orwen, one of the three Witches of Morva, who has a fixation on Fflewddur.
- Billie Hayes as Orgoch, one of the three Witches of Morva, with a crazy personality.
- Wayne Allwine, James Almanzar, Candy Candido, Fondacaro, Steve Hale, Jack Laing, Phil Nibbelink, and Peter Renaday as the Horned King's Huntsmen.
- John Hurt as The Horned King, a vicious king of skeletal appearance who longs to find the Black Cauldron for world conquest.
- John Huston as The Narrator.

== Production ==
=== Development ===
In 1964, Lloyd Alexander began publishing his five-volume series The Chronicles of Prydain, with the first installment titled The Book of Three. According to Joe Hale, Lenore Duckwall, the wife of production manager Don Duckwall, had read the books and suggested an adaptation to her husband. Don Duckwall then showed the books to Wolfgang "Woolie" Reitherman, who agreed to adapt the series into an animated film. Hale further noted, "The [Disney] Studio pictures at that time were not appealing to teenagers, who were the bulk of the audience in the theaters ... They wanted to make a PG-rated picture that would attract an older audience." Walt Disney Productions optioned Alexander's five-volume series in 1971. Pre-production work began in 1973 when the film rights to Alexander's books were finally obtained. According to Ollie Johnston, he and Frank Thomas supported the film adaptation, and that if it had been done properly, it might have been "as good as Snow White". Because of the numerous storylines, and with over thirty characters in the original series, several story artists and animators worked on the film's development throughout the 1970s.

When The Rescuers (1977) was completed, The Black Cauldron was tentatively scheduled to be released in 1980. Veteran artist Mel Shaw created preliminary conceptual pastel sketches, which future Disney president and CEO Ron Miller considered to be too advanced for the newly-hired animators. Therefore, by August 1978, the studio had pushed its release date back to Christmas 1984 due to their inability to animate realistic human characters; its original release date was later assumed by The Fox and the Hound (1981). During its development limbo, storyboard artist Vance Gerry drew panels of beat storyboards that outlined the plot, action, and locations. Having established the three principal characters, Gerry adapted the Horned King into a big-bellied Viking who had a red beard, fiery temper, and wore a steel helmet with two large horns. Meanwhile, Miller hired Rosemary Anne Sisson as they desired an experienced British screenwriter for the film.

Animator John Musker was the film's initial director, having been offered the position by production head Tom Wilhite. As director, Musker was assigned to expand several sequences in the first act, but they were eventually deemed too comedic. Musker explained, "...the older people I was working with didn't like any of my ideas." When production on The Fox and the Hound (1981) had wrapped, several feature animation directors Art Stevens, Richard Rich, Ted Berman, and Dave Michener became involved in The Black Cauldron. When Miller decided too many people were involved, he decided Stevens was not appropriate to supervise the project so he contacted Joe Hale, who was a longtime layout artist at Disney Studios, to serve as producer. Hale, who had finished animation special effects work on The Watcher in the Woods (1980), initially declined the offer due to his friendship with Art Stevens, and wanting to continue working on live-action projects. Miller replied regardless of his involvement or not, Stevens would be replaced. After a reconsideration, Hale accepted the offer.

With Hale as producer, actual production on The Black Cauldron officially began in 1980. He discarded visual character artwork submitted by Tim Burton, and along with Rich and Berman, they desired a Sleeping Beauty (1959)–styled visual approach. Both directors brought Milt Kahl out of retirement to create new character designs for Taran, Eilonwy, Fflewddur Fflam, and the other principal characters. Hale and the story team (including two story artists David Jonas and Al Wilson that he added) heavily revised the film, by which they capsulized the stories of the first two books. They also made some considerable changes, which led to Sisson's departure as she developed creative differences with Hale and the directors.

Musker and Ron Clements, also citing creative differences, were removed from the project and began development on The Great Mouse Detective (1986). Displeased with Gerry's concept for the Horned King, Hale turned the Horned King into a thin creature donning a hood and carrying a spectral presence with shadowed face and glowing red eyes. His role was then expanded into a composite villain of several characters from the books. Taran and Eilonwy eventually acquired elements of the past designs and costumes of earlier Disney characters, especially the latter, who was drawn to resemble Princess Aurora.

=== Casting ===
According to Musker, Gary Burghoff of M*A*S*H fame had auditioned as Gurgi. He tried numerous vocal iterations since Ted Berman had no idea how the character should sound. After three hours, the directors grew frustrated and Burghoff, who had refused to leave, was thrown out of the studio. By 1982, John Byner, an impressionist, had been cast in the part. After Byner was shown the character concepts for Gurgi, he felt inspired to add a "child's inflection" when creating the voice.

In January 1981, Hayley Mills stated she was being considered for the voice of Eilonwy. That same year, Mills hosted an episode of NBC's Disney's Wonderful World, in which she met with Hale and the directors to discuss the part. The role eventually went to Susan Sheridan. According to Sheridan, she recorded the voice on three separate trips to the Disney studios. In a 1983 Disney Channel special titled Backstage at Disney, Hale stated that Jonathan Winters was voicing King Eidilleg. The role eventually went to Arthur Malet.

=== Test-screening and editing ===
Shortly before the film's initially planned 1984 theatrical release, a test screening for the rough cut of The Black Cauldron was held at the studio's private theater in Burbank, California. After the film, particularly the climactic "cauldron-born" sequence, proved to be too intense and disturbing for the children in the audience, the newly appointed Disney studio chairman Jeffrey Katzenberg ordered certain scenes from The Black Cauldron be cut, as a result of the length and the fear that their nature would alienate children. Since animated films were generally edited in storyboard form using Leica reels (later known as animatics: storyboards shot sequentially and set to temporary audio tracks), producer Joe Hale objected to Katzenberg's demands. Katzenberg responded by having the film brought into an edit bay and editing the film himself.

Informed of what Katzenberg was doing by Hale, the newly appointed Disney CEO Michael Eisner called Katzenberg in the editing room and convinced him to stop. Though he did as Eisner insisted, Katzenberg requested that the film be modified, and delayed its scheduled Christmas 1984 release to July 1985 so that the film could be reworked.

The film was ultimately cut by twelve minutes, with existing scenes rewritten and reanimated for continuity. Many of the deleted scenes involved extended character interactions, but other edits involved violent content, including the undead "Cauldron-Born", who are used as the Horned King's army in the film's final act. While most of the scenes were seamlessly removed from the film, the Cauldron-Born sequence contains rather recognizable lapses because the removal of the scenes of the Cauldron-Born mauling the henchmen, as well as one of them being dissolved by the mist, creates a jump in the film's soundtrack.

=== Animation ===
Invented by David W. Spencer from the studio's still camera department, the animation photo transfer process (APT) was first used for The Black Cauldron which would enhance the technology by which the rough animation would be processed onto celluloid though this was tested in The Fox and the Hound in a few scenes. First, the rough animation would be photographed onto high-contrast lithographic film, and the resulting negative would be copied onto the plastic cel sheets that would transfer the color of the lines, which eventually eliminated the hand-inking process. However, as the APT-transferred line art would fade off of the cels over time, most of the film's animation was done using the xerographic process, which had been used by Disney since the late 1950s. Spencer would win a technical Academy Award for this process, but the computer system CAPS would soon render the APT process obsolete.

The Black Cauldron is notable for being Disney's first animated feature film to incorporate computer-generated imagery in its animation for bubbles, a boat, a floating orb of light, and the cauldron itself. Though The Black Cauldron was released a year before The Great Mouse Detective, both films were in production simultaneously for some time and the computer graphics for the latter were done first. When producer Joe Hale heard about what was being done, the possibilities made him excited and he made the crew from The Great Mouse Detective project create some computer animation for his own film. For other effects, animator Don Paul used live action footage of dry ice mists to create the steam and smoke coming out of the cauldron.

The film was the last Disney animated film to be completed at the original Animation Building of the Walt Disney Studios (Walt Disney Productions) in Burbank, California. The animation department was moved to the Air Way facility in nearby Glendale in December 1984, and following corporate restructuring, eventually returned to the Burbank studio in the mid-1990s at a new facility.

== Soundtrack ==
Unlike most other Disney animated films of the time, the film does not include any musical numbers, only containing a musical score. The score, composed and conducted by Elmer Bernstein, used the ondes Martenot to build upon the dark mood of Prydain, an instrument he used previously in Trading Places (1983) and Ghostbusters (1984).

Due to last minute revisions, much of Bernstein's score was cut from the film. In its minority, the score was re-recorded for the album original release by Varèse Sarabande in 1985, with the composer conducting the Utah Symphony Orchestra. The album soon fell out of print and many of the film's tracks did not resurface until a bootleg copy entitled "Taran" was supplied to soundtrack specialty outlets in 1986. The film tracks received their premiere release in 2012 as part of Intrada Records' partnership with Walt Disney Records to issue several Disney film soundtracks.

== Release ==
For its initial release, the film became the first Disney animated film to receive a PG rating from the Motion Picture Association. It was also presented in Super Technirama 70, the first Disney animated feature released in that format since Sleeping Beauty, and with Dolby Stereo 70mm six-track surround sound. The film's initial theatrical release was accompanied by the Donald Duck short Chips Ahoy.

The film was rereleased in 1990 in selected markets as Taran and the Magic Cauldron.

=== Box office ===
The Black Cauldron was released in North America on July 24, 1985. While officially budgeted by Disney executives at $25 million, the film's production manager, Don Hahn, said in his documentary, Waking Sleeping Beauty, that it cost $44 million to produce the film, making it the most expensive animated film ever made at the time. The film grossed $21.3 million domestically, putting the future of the animation department in jeopardy and earning it the nickname "the film that almost killed Disney". The film was not only outgrossed by The Care Bears Movie, an animated feature with a significantly lower budget, but also by a rerelease of the studios' own One Hundred and One Dalmatians. Unlike most animated Disney features, it was not rereleased to theaters every seven years. It was also not distributed on home video until thirteen years after its theatrical run. The film was however more successful outside North America, notably in France, where it had more than 3 million admissions and was the fifth most attended film of the year.

== Reception and legacy ==
On the review aggregator website Rotten Tomatoes, the film had an approval rating of 57% based on 37 reviews, with an average score of 5.7/10. The critics' consensus reads: "Ambitious but flawed, The Black Cauldron is technically brilliant as usual, but lacks the compelling characters of other Disney animated classics." On Metacritic, the film had a weighted average score of 59 out of 100, based on 16 critics, indicating "mixed or average reviews".

Roger Ebert of Chicago Sun-Times gave the film 3.5 stars out of 4, praising the film as "a rip-roaring tale of swords and sorcery, evil and revenge, magic and pluck and luck... And it takes us on a journey through a kingdom of some of the more memorable characters in any recent Disney film." He noted how "involving" the story was, and felt "the key to the movie is in the richness of the characterizations, and the two best characters, I think, are the Horned King and a fuzzy little creature named Gurgi."

Charles Solomon of the Los Angeles Times wrote that the "highly dimensional sound track, with its opulent Elmer Bernstein score and excellent vocal performances, is a technological work of art. But it is the animation itself with some of the best work the studio has produced since Walt Disney's death in 1966 that dazzles the viewer." He felt that if "its script and direction were equal to the animation, Cauldron would be a masterpiece to rank with Snow White and Pinocchio, instead of the frustrating, beautiful, exciting and ultimately unsatisfying film that it is."

Walter Goodman, reviewing for The New York Times, praised the animation and John Hurt's performance, but believed "[p]eople old enough to recall their delight at earlier feature animations, no doubt burnished by memory, are not of course the audience at which The Black Cauldron is aimed. Nor, apparently, is it aimed at youngsters who have had a taste of more sophisticated animation of the Star Wars breed of movies."

London's Time Out magazine deemed it "a major disappointment", adding that "the charm, characterization and sheer good humor" found in previous Disney efforts "are sadly absent".

Charles Champlin, also from the Los Angeles Times, wrote that The Black Cauldron lacks "the simplicity and the clarity of great fairy tales, or the child-sized wonder of Margery Sharp's stories that became The Rescuers, the last really successful Disney animated feature. One wonderful chase in the old riotously inventive slapstick tradition and two minor comic figures suggest the pleasures that can result when the inventing animators have a fertile ground to start from. But a lot of the way the film seems to be dutifully following a rather cumbersome and not overly attractive story."

Jeffrey Katzenberg, then-chairman of the Walt Disney Studios, was dismayed by the product and the animators believed that it lacked "the humor, pathos, and the fantasy which had been so strong in Lloyd Alexander's work. The story had been a once-in-a-lifetime opportunity and it was heartbreaking to see such wonderful material wasted."

Lloyd Alexander, the author of the books on which the film was based, had a more complicated reaction to the film:

First, I have to say, there is no resemblance between the movie and the book. Having said that, the movie in itself, purely as a movie, I found to be very enjoyable. I had fun watching it. What I would hope is that anyone who sees the movie would certainly enjoy it, but I'd also hope that they'd actually read the book. The book is quite different. It's a very powerful, very moving story, and I think people would find a lot more depth in the book.

=== Home media ===
The Black Cauldron was first released on VHS in the United Kingdom in 1997, and in the United States on August 4, 1998, as part of the Walt Disney Masterpiece Collection, in a pan-and-scan transfer, 13 years after its theatrical release. The film received a DVD release with a 2.20:1 non-anamorphic widescreen transfer in 2000, as part of the Walt Disney Gold Classic Collection line, featuring an art gallery, a new game The Quest for the Black Cauldron, and the 1952 Donald Duck short Trick or Treat. In 2008, Disney announced a Special Edition DVD release of the film to be released in 2009, but was re-advertised as a "25th Anniversary Edition" and released on September 14, 2010, in the US and UK. It contained the original 2.35:1 anamorphic widescreen transfer, the new Witch's Challenge game, an unfinished deleted scene, and all of the features from the 2000 DVD release.

In November 2019, the film was released in 4K for the launch of Disney+. On May 4, 2021, the film was released on Blu-ray exclusively through Disney Movie Club.

=== Theme parks ===
Costumed versions of the characters from the film have made occasional appearances at the Disney Parks mostly in Fantasyland.

In 1986, the eatery Lancer's Inn at Walt Disney World, was renamed Gurgi's Munchings and Crunchings. Eventually, in 1993 it was closed and then remodeled into Lumiere's Kitchen, The Village Fry Shoppe, and currently The Friar's Nook.

On July 11, 1986, Tokyo Disneyland opened Cinderella Castle Mystery Tour, a walk-through attraction in which the Horned King makes an appearance. The attraction was in operation until 2006. To tie in with the attraction's opening, a 14-day special event and castle show The Mystery of Cinderella Castle was featured on the Cinderella Castle Forecourt Stage, featuring Mickey Mouse, Donald Duck, and Goofy, with Princess Aurora, Prince Phillip, and Maleficent from Sleeping Beauty. During the battle against Maleficent's forces by Goofy, Donald, Phillip, and Aurora, a cameo appearance is made by Creeper with other Disney villains.

=== Video games ===
The video game The Black Cauldron was designed by Al Lowe of Sierra On-Line and released in 1986. It was made shortly after the first King's Quest game, and it resembles that adventure in many ways. Along with The Dark Crystal it remains one of only a few adventure games by Sierra to be based on films.

In the Famicom game Mickey Mouse III: Yume Fuusen, The Horned King appears as the final boss.

The world-building video game Disney Magic Kingdoms includes Taran, Eilonwy, Fflewddur Fflam, Gurgi and the Horned King as playable characters, and attractions based on the Horned King's Castle and Fairfolk Whirlpool, as well as some establishments and decorations based on the film.

=== In other Disney projects ===
Along with Disney animated characters, the characters of the film have recurring cameo appearances in the television series House of Mouse. During the episode "House of Magic", Daisy Duck uses the Black Cauldron for a magic show, with disastrous results.

The cauldron is important in, and the Horned King appears in, the direct-to-video film Once Upon a Halloween, which shows several scenes as flashbacks. In the film, the cauldron is now the property of the Evil Queen from Snow White and the Seven Dwarfs.

Along with other Walt Disney Animation Studios characters, the main characters of the film have cameo appearances in the short film Once Upon a Studio.

== Related future project ==
In 2016, Walt Disney Pictures had re-acquired the film rights to The Chronicles of Prydain, on which the animated feature film The Black Cauldron was based, with the intention to adapt the book series into a live-action feature film series. The project was in early development at the Walt Disney Studios with no director, producer, or screenwriter attached yet. Since then, there have been no further reports about the project.

== See also ==
- List of films about witchcraft

== Bibliography ==
- Ghez, Didier, ed. (2011). "Joe Hale". Walt's People: Volume 11 — Talking Disney with the Artists who Knew Him. Xlibris. pp. 514–561. ISBN 978-1-465-36840-9.
- Hulett, Steve (2014). Mouse In Transition: An Insider's Look at Disney Feature Animation. Theme Park Press. ISBN 978-1-941500-24-8.
- Stewart, James B. (2005). DisneyWar (1st ed.). New York: Simon & Schuster. ISBN 0-684-80993-1.
