= Rock Odyssey =

1987 animated film by Hanna-Barbera

- Directed by: Joseph Barbera; William Hanna; Additional director: Robert Taylor (uncredited)
- Written by: Robert Taylor; Joseph Barbera; Neal Barbera
- Produced by: Joseph Barbera; William Hanna
- Starring: Scatman Crothers
- Edited by: Warner E. Leighton; Margaret Webb
- Music by: Hoyt Curtin
- Production company: Hanna-Barbera Productions
- Distributed by: Worldvision Enterprises
- Release date: July 13, 1987 (Los Angeles International Animation Celebration)
- Running time: 72 minutes
- Country: United States
- Language: English

Rock Odyssey is an animated jukebox musical feature film produced by Hanna-Barbera for a Worldvision Enterprises release in 1987. Directed by Robert Taylor (but credited to William Hanna and Joseph Barbera on the final print), with storyboards by Pete Alvarado, it features Scatman Crothers in his final film appearance, and was released following his death. The film was dedicated to his memory.

The film was released on a program of special world premiere matinee screenings of the Los Angeles International Animation Celebration's opening day gala event, but it never received a wide theatrical release.

== Plot ==
Idol Laura seeks out to find her one true love after being separated as children through the history of music.

In the 1950s, she meets greaser Billy. Their relationship is born out of a love for dancing and rock and roll. Billy later gets into trouble with a street gang who beat him up. Laura helps him get back on his feet by giving him a prize she won at a carnival game. Billy's car becomes out of control, which worsens the relationship despite attempts to make things better such as going to a drive-in movie and prom. At prom, Billy crashes his car, and later that night, Laura decides to break up with him. Billy tries to win her back by singing, but inadvertently floods the venue with a tidal wave of punch. The singing alerts a string of monsters, which chase after Billy, resulting in the prom being a disaster and ending with him all alone.

In the 1960s, Laura meets Bob, a piano playing hippie, while at a peace rally. The two of them hit it off after Bob saves Laura from being chased by police officers with siren heads. Upon heading to his apartment, Laura learns about Bob's past as a musical activist and begins to recall traumatic memories. To get his mind off, he and Laura read a storybook titled Sir Gleam Fights the Evil Tooth. Despite the book being cartoony in nature, Bob and Laura are shocked by its depiction of warfare, as the knight in the story is constantly defeated by Tooth Decay, the anthropomorphic castle, and thus turned into a chocolate kiss. While Bob recounts how he got his ways to Laura, an officer begins rapping at his door. Upon opening, the officer turns into an undead soldier who delivers Bob a draft notice which in turn transforms into a death certificate for Bob. To get their minds off of things, the two head for a walk in the park, where Bob begins to perceive inanimate objects as military weapons, terrifying him further. No longer able to view the real world, Bob starts seeing hellish scenery through two women using a Quija board. Unable to deal with Bob's trauma, Laura decides to leave and gets on a bus to get out of town, only to be taunted by her own monsters. Bob returns, now controlled by marionette strings, morphes into a skeleton soldier and catches fire, leaving Laura heartbroken.

In the 1970s, Jack, a fisherman at a winter port and his pet lobster head out to sea. The lobster informs Jack of Laura, who is discovered to be frozen in ice. She quickly thaws and Jack helps provide her with warmth, humor and comfort. While another, bigger boat tries to harpoon a nearby whale, the three express opposition to killing it and succeed in cutting the harpoon line, but Jack gets caught in the rope and the two boats collide, causing him to drown. Laura, the lobster and a seagull make it to the lifeboat, and the lobster retrieves Jack’s body. Looking at him, Laura begins to flashback to her days as a youth sailing and exploring with her male friend, culminating with her having to witness the death of her friend, mirroring her having to say goodbye to Jack. The lifeboat's motor backfires and falls into the water, the three are greeted by monsters, and a thunderstorm occurs. Jack's spirit comes by and the lobster gladly goes with him. After waving goodbye, the seagull hands Laura the remains of a bottle containing alcohol, which helps her get her mind off of things.

In the 1980s, Laura, now under the alias of Peggy Sue, moves into a new apartment and gets a job working at a technology company. At her apartment, she meets the Joker, a monster who has several affairs with her. Laura becomes more clumsy at work and after trying to use a supercomputer gets knocked out. Upon waking up, she is greeted by the man from the computer screen, who is kind and gives her a cab ride home. The man morphs into Billy, Bob and Jack, which inspires Laura to retrace her steps. Sloppily by a dealership, she gets a new car, drives to the port town and mistakes a fisherman for Jack. At a gas station, she notices a man playing piano inside of a shipping truck and is disappointed upon learning that it is not Bob. She finds an abandoned diner and plugs in a jukebox, causing the spirit of Billy to briefly appear, disappointing her more. The Joker returns, holding a jewel Laura left behind in Billy's car on prom night. Laura follows him and he reveals himself to be Laura's True Love, being a combination of Billy, Bob, and Jack. The Joker takes the form of his truest self and he and Laura happily reunite.

== Characters ==
- The Jukebox is the narrator of the story and is voiced by Scatman Crothers and Frank Welker (additional dialogue). He is the only character in the film with lines of dialogue. This was known to be Crothers' last film before his death.
- Laura, also known as Peggy Sue, is a romantic, mysterious idol who sets out to find her one true love.
- Billy is a stereotypical 1950s greaser and Laura's love interest for the decade.
- Bob is a traumatized musical activist and hippie who is Laura's love interest in the 1960s.
- Jack is a fisherman and Laura's love interest in the 1970s. Accompanying him are his pet lobster and a seagull.
- True Love, introduced as the Joker in his initial form, is the combination of Billy, Bob, and Jack and is Laura's one true love.

== Production notes ==
Production of Rock Odyssey began in 1981 at Hanna-Barbera's short-lived feature animation unit, as a follow-up project to Heidi's Song. It was intended as a prime-time TV special for ABC, and was mentioned in a fall 1981 H-B trade ad as being slated to air in the spring of 1982, but the project was shelved after executives at H-B and corporate parent Taft Entertainment saw the film's graphic imagery, particularly relating to the 1960s and the Vietnam War. Subsequently, Robert Taylor left the studio, and H-B closed their feature animation unit, after the box-office failure of Heidi's Song.

The program was shelved by Hanna-Barbera, who intended to retool the program; at a March 1983 Congressional hearing on children's television, ABC children's programming VP Squire Rushnell mentioned that it was slated to air that year. The film, however, remained on the shelf until the mid-80s, at which time a new sequence was added, featuring classic Hanna-Barbera cartoon clips set to "Wake Me Up Before You Go-Go". This sequence was intended to bring the film "up to date", since the rest of the soundtrack only covered songs up to 1980. Hanna-Barbera and Worldvision Enterprises made Rock Odyssey available for international television distribution in 1987, and the film is mentioned in trade advertisements from that year. Ironically, this final completed and released version seems to retain all of the "offensive" scenes which had led H-B to shelve the project back in the early 80s.

Rock Odyssey has never been released on VHS and LaserDisc, and has not yet been aired on TV, or released on DVD or Blu-ray in the United States by Warner Home Video, but it was screened at the second Los Angeles International Animation Celebration in July 1987. It has also aired on TV in Spain and several Latin American countries, with the narration dubbed into Spanish.

Despite all this, clips from the film were used for HBTV and a poster of Rock Odyssey can be seen in The Flintstones TV film Hollyrock-a-Bye Baby.

The film was aired (in English) on Boomerang Southeast Asia on April 1, 2010.

As of 2023, the film is available (unofficially) to watch in its entirety on the Internet Archive.

== Songs ==
The film has no dialogue (except the Jukebox's narration) and few sound effects, instead relying almost entirely on music for its soundtrack. Below is a list of all the songs featured in the film.

=== Opening ===
- Rock It (Paul DeKorte / Doug Boyd) (Note: This song also appears during the 1980s segment.)

=== 1950s ===
- Blue Suede Shoes (Robert Jason)
- The Great Pretender (Paul DeKorte / Mitch Gordon / Richard Bolks / Jim Gilstrap / Ron Hicklin)
- Searchin (Billy Richards / Herman Channey / Bobby Sheen / Bobby Nunn)
- Blueberry Hill (Jim Gilstrap)
- Great Balls of Fire (Robert Jason)
- Bye Bye Love (Jerry Whitman / Ron Hicklin)
- Roll Over Beethoven (Robert Jason)

=== 1960s ===
- Help (Paul DeKorte / Doug Boyd / Ron Hicklin)
- Satisfaction (Jim Haas / Ron Hicklin)
- For What It's Worth (Paul DeKorte / Robert Jason)
- Aquarius (Ron Harris / Edie Lehman / Paul DeKorte / Mitch Gordon / Myrna Mathews / Sandie Hall / Ron Hicklin)
- Purple Haze (Instrumental)
- Blowin' in the Wind (Instrumental)
- You Keep Me Hangin' On (Edie Lehman / Myrna Mathews / Sandie Hall)

=== 1970s ===
- Bad, Bad Leroy Brown (Myrna Mathews / Sandie Hall / Robert Jason / Gail Farrell)
- Rock the Boat (Jess Harnell / Jon Paul Joyce / Sandie Hall)
- Yesterday (Doug Boyd)
- Yesterdays (Instrumental)
- I Really Don't Want to Know (Paul DeKorte / Mitch Gordon / Richard Bolks / Robert Jason / Ron Harris)
- Summer Breeze (Paul DeKorte / Doug Boyd)
- I'm a Woman (Madeline Yergari)

=== 1980s ===
- Stayin' Alive (Robert Jason)
- Till We Meet Again (Loulie Jean Norman)
- Wake Me Up Before You Go-Go (Paul DeKorte / Sandie Hall / Ron Hicklin / Edie Lehman)
- On the Road Again (Paul DeKorte / Robert Jason)
- Just the Way You Are (Paul DeKorte / Sandie Hall / Ron Hicklin / Edie Lehman)
- Old Time Rock and Roll (Jess Harnell / Jon Paul Joyce / Sandie Hall)
