= Oliver & Company =

1988 American animated film

- Theatrical release poster
- Directed by: George Scribner
- Screenplay by: Jim Cox; Tim Disney; James Mangold
- Story by: Vance Gerry; Mike Gabriel; Joe Ranft; Jim Mitchell; Chris Bailey; Kirk Wise; Dave Michener; Roger Allers; Gary Trousdale; Kevin Lima; Michael Cedeno; Pete Young; Leon Joosen
- Based on: Oliver Twist by Charles Dickens
- Starring: Joey Lawrence; Billy Joel; Cheech Marin; Richard Mulligan; Roscoe Lee Browne; Sheryl Lee Ralph; Dom DeLuise; Taurean Blacque; Carl Weintraub; Robert Loggia; Natalie Gregory; William Glover; Bette Midler
- Edited by: Mark Hester; James Melton
- Music by: J. A. C. Redford
- Production company: Walt Disney Feature Animation
- Distributed by: Buena Vista Pictures Distribution (Note: Distributed under the Walt Disney Pictures banner, with funding by Silver Screen Partners III.)
- Release dates: November 13, 1988 (Ziegfeld Theatre); November 18, 1988 (United States)
- Running time: 74 minutes
- Country: United States
- Language: English
- Budget: $31 million
- Box office: $121 million

Oliver & Company is a 1988 American animated musical comedy film produced by Walt Disney Feature Animation and inspired by the Charles Dickens novel Oliver Twist. It was directed by George Scribner and written by Jim Cox, Tim Disney, and James Mangold. In the film, Oliver is a homeless kitten who joins a gang of dogs centered around Fagin and Dodger to survive in the streets. Among other changes, the setting of the film was relocated from 19th-century London to late 1980s New York City, and Sykes is a loan shark.

In late 1984 or 1985, Michael Eisner and Jeffrey Katzenberg held a pitch meeting with the animation staff. After story artist Pete Young pitched the idea to adapt Oliver Twist with dogs, the pitch was quickly approved, and the film quickly went into production under the working title Oliver and the Dodger. Pre-production started with the crew reading Oliver Twist and watching the musical Oliver!, developing the film for six to nine months. After production began in 1986, 300 artists and technicians worked on the film within two and a half years of production.

Along with The Land Before Time, Oliver & Company was released theatrically on November 18, 1988. The film received mixed reviews from critics. While the music and vocal performances of celebrities were praised, the animation, designs, its use of computer-generated imagery, and plot received divided reviews. The film however performed very well at the box office, grossing $121 million worldwide against the budget of $31 million.

The film was re-released in theaters in the United States, Canada, and the United Kingdom on March 29, 1996. It was released on home video in North America on September 24, 1996, on VHS and LaserDisc. A DVD edition followed on May 14, 2002, as a special edition. Oliver & Company was later released on Blu-ray Disc on August 6, 2013, to commemorate its 25th anniversary.

== Plot ==
Outside a shop in New York City, several orphaned kittens are put up for adoption; all of them manage to find homes except for an orange tabby, who begins wandering the streets hoping that someone will take him in. One day, the kitten meets Dodger, a street-wise Jack Russell Terrier, who helps him steal food from a hot dog vendor before fleeing, prompting the kitten to pursue him.

The kitten chases Dodger to a barge, where he watches him sharing the stolen food with his friends—Tito the Chihuahua, Einstein the Great Dane, Francis the Bulldog, and Rita the Saluki. Their owner, Fagin, is a petty thief indebted to Sykes, a nefarious loan shark, who gives him an ultimatum to repay his debt in three days. After the other dogs encounter the kitten, they are confronted by Sykes' two Dobermanns, Roscoe and DeSoto, who threaten to eat the kitten until he claws DeSoto's nose, a deed that earns the kitten respect from Fagin and the dogs.

The next day, Fagin goes to pawn some of his stolen goods, while the dogs and the kitten try to steal more money for him. Through a theatrical ruse, the animals stop a limousine belonging to the wealthy Foxworth family, but their attempt to rob the limo fails, and the kitten is discovered by the family's child Jenny, who is worried that her parents, who are on a business trip, won't be able to return home in time for her eighth birthday. Jenny adopts the kitten, whom she names Oliver, and bonds with him, much to the ire of Georgette, the Foxworths' spoiled prize-winning poodle.

Meanwhile, Dodger and the other dogs believe that Oliver has been kidnapped, and they go to the Foxworths' house to "rescue" him. With the help of Georgette, the group take Oliver back to their barge, but Oliver refuses, expressing his need to stay with Jenny and making Dodger feel betrayed. As Oliver attempts to return to Jenny's house, Fagin stops him from leaving and recognizes from Oliver's new collar and gold name tag that he has been adopted by a wealthy family; seeing this as an opportunity, Fagin decides to hold Oliver for ransom and informs Sykes of his plan.

Having found Fagin's ransom note, Jenny and a reluctant Georgette set out to retrieve Oliver. Jenny meets with Fagin, who is shocked to be dealing with a child; bothered by his conscience, Fagin gives Oliver back to Jenny freely by pretending to have found him. However, Sykes, who was watching the events take place, abducts Jenny with the intention of blackmailing her family, ending his deal with Fagin. Oliver, Georgette, and the other dogs sneak into Sykes' warehouse to rescue Jenny with Fagin helping them escape via his trike. Sykes, Roscoe, and DeSoto chase the group into the subway tunnels where Roscoe and DeSoto are fatally electrocuted on the third rail of the subway following a battle between Oliver, Dodger and the other dogs, while Sykes is killed after his car collides with a train on the Brooklyn Bridge.

Following the incident, Jenny and Oliver are reunited. They later celebrate Jenny's birthday with the dogs, Fagin, and the Foxworths' butler, Winston, who learns that Jenny's parents are returning home tomorrow. Oliver opts to stay with Jenny but promises to remain in contact with Dodger and the gang.

== Voice cast ==
- Joey Lawrence as Oliver, an orphaned tabby kitten who is looking for a home. Based on Oliver Twist
- Natalie Gregory as Jennifer "Jenny" Foxworth, a friendly, young rich girl who adopts Oliver. Based on Mr. Brownlow, Rose Maylie and Nancy
  - Myhanh Tran provided the singing voice for Jenny.
- Billy Joel as Dodger, the charismatic, laid-back Jack Russell Terrier leader of his gang of dogs. Based on Artful Dodger
- Cheech Marin as Tito, a Mexican-accented Chihuahua in Fagin's gang. Based on Charley Bates
- Dom DeLuise as Fagin, a lowly but well-meaning thief who lives on a barge with his dogs. Based on Fagin
- Robert Loggia as Sykes, a loan shark and shipyard agent who lent a considerable sum of money to Fagin. Based on Bill Sykes
- Sheryl Lee Ralph as Rita, a Saluki in Fagin's gang.
  - Ruth Pointer provided the singing voice for Rita.
- Roscoe Lee Browne as Francis, a Shakespeare Bulldog in Fagin's gang.
- Richard Mulligan as Einstein, a gray Great Dane in Fagin's gang.
- Bette Midler as Georgette, the Foxworth family's poodle.
- Taurean Blacque and Carl Weintraub as Roscoe and DeSoto, respectively: Sykes' violent Doberman Pinschers.
- William Glover as Winston, the Foxworth family's butler.
- Frank Welker as Louie the Sausage Vendor.

== Production ==
=== Development ===
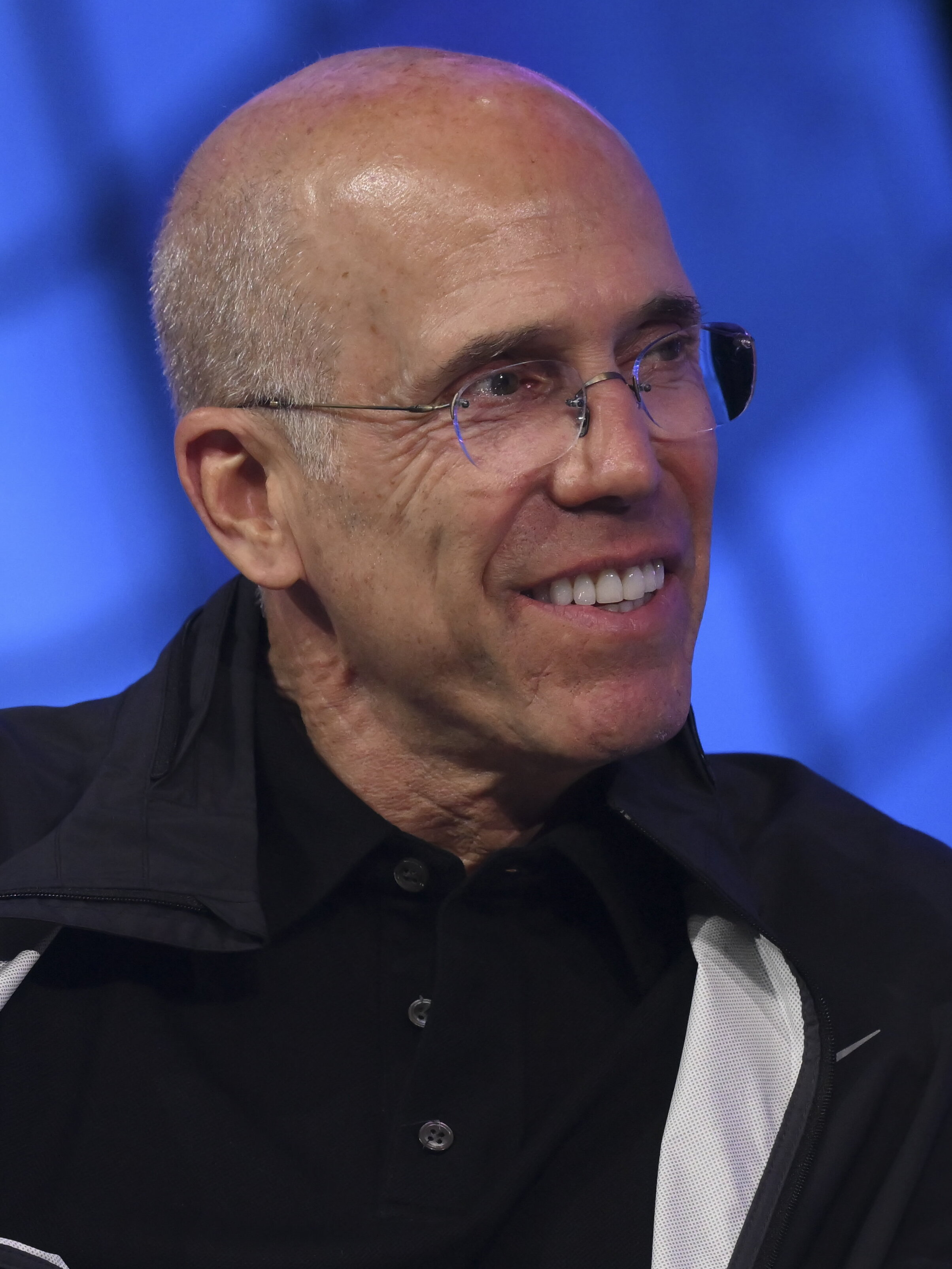
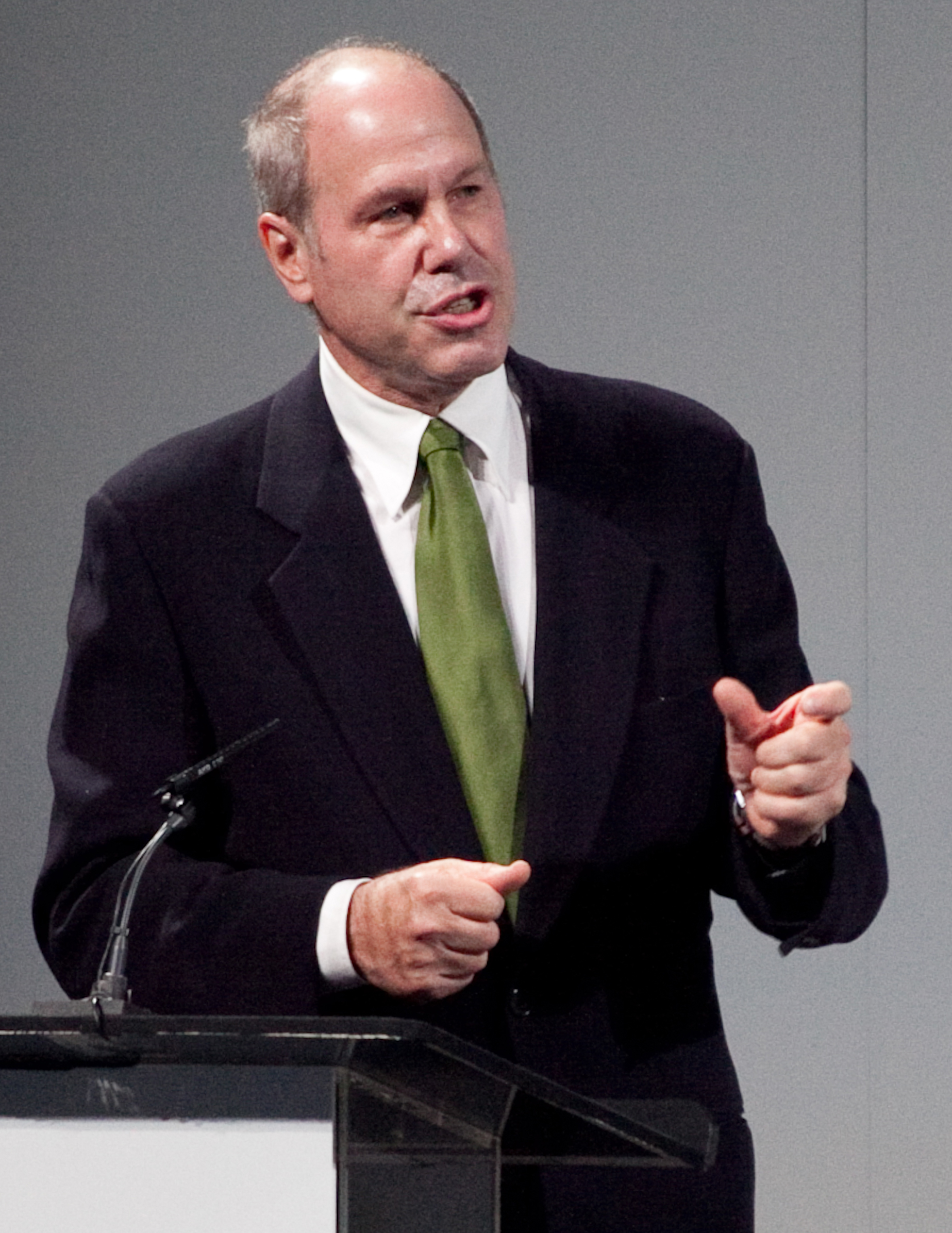
Jeffrey Katzenberg and Michael Eisner invited twenty film executives to pitch ideas in the meeting referred to as the "Gong Show". Along with The Little Mermaid (1989), Katzenberg approved the pitch of the film for development.

Oliver & Company was the first animated film developed by The Walt Disney Company to begin production under the supervision of Michael Eisner and Jeffrey Katzenberg; the duo, who had previously worked at Paramount Pictures as chairman and head of production, joined the company in 1984.

In late 1984 or 1985, (Note: Although George Scribner has stated that the "Gong Show" happened in late 1984, several sources stated that it happened in 1985. It is unknown which time-frame is more accurate.) Eisner and Katzenberg invited twenty film executives to pitch potential ideas for upcoming animated features, a meeting called the "Gong Show". After Ron Clements had pitched The Little Mermaid (1989) and Treasure Planet (2002) to Eisner and Katzenberg, story artist Pete Young suggested, "Oliver Twist with dogs." The next day, Katzenberg, who had previously developed a live-action adaptation of the musical Oliver! at Paramount, approved the pitch for possible development, along with The Little Mermaid. George Scribner and Richard Rich were announced as the directors of the project, while Pete Young was appointed as story supervisor. However, Young died unexpectedly in late 1985, and Rich was fired from Disney about six months into production, leaving Scribner as the sole director.

Pre-production started with a table reading of the novel Oliver Twist and watching the musical Oliver!. As the film was first developed for six to nine months, the first year was difficult for the crew. Some producers, directors, and storyboard artists felt unhappy with the direction of the film, believing that "it had lost some of its contemporary edge." Because of negative feedback, Scribner tried to revise the film to be "less obvious with the material" and include "a more hip, contemporary sensibility" of the period. Production officially began in 1986, and the film was given the working title of Oliver and the Dodger, but it was later changed to Oliver & Company for unknown reasons. (Note: It was speculated that it could be a homage to Oliver! due to some of the musical numbers being designated to be "performed by Oliver and Company.") Within two and a half years of production beginning, 300 artists and technicians worked on the film.

Initially, Oliver and Dodger were two kittens, then two dogs, changing back and forth before it was decided that Oliver would be isolated if he was a "different type of character,". They turned Oliver into a naïve kitten and Dodger and the gang into dogs in the final adaptation of the film. Since they were considering Tina Turner to voice Rita, the Rita character's first name was Tina. Her name was changed twice―Nancy and Rita―the latter name adopted in August 1986. Georgette was created by Scribner and the film's animators. Sykes was the final character to be created for the film. Sykes was initially created as a Dobermann and early story drafts included Sykes developing a relationship between Oliver and Rita to establish the Dobermann's point of attack.

Some characters that were intended to appear in the film were also discarded. As work continued on Oliver, Roy E. Disney conceived that Fagin would attempt to steal a rare panda from the Central Park Zoo, along with the gang, and that Oliver would have helped a panda return to the zoo. These concepts were seen in a draft written as late as August 1986. The writers worked with the idea for approximately nine months before insurmountable problems arose with the story. The panda subplot was dropped when producers suggested Fagin hold Oliver for ransom, treating the boy as a valuable, rare Asian cat. The panda was also replaced by Jenny. Jenny was intended to live with her mother, but the story crew changed her mother into a maid, and later, a butler. A policeman's horse, Kaminski, who would always ask Dodger if he is staying out of trouble, was also intended to appear in the film.

=== Writing and story revisions ===
With story artists and writers working together for the film, twenty people contributed story ideas to the film under supervision of Scribner. By the end of their labors, the story was set in two forms―a set of several boards and a compact screenplay, with a million story sketches created for the film. The film went through several rewrites during production, with some revision goals including giving Oliver "more attitude" and developing Oliver and his two relationships with Dodger and Rita, according to a draft dating September 24, 1985.

In early story drafts, Dodger was given a smaller role. With Einstein originally planned to be a vital character, the writers intended for Fagin to visit Sykes' office with Einstein, who would be attacked by the Dobermanns and "carried out, bloodied and lifeless." During the film's climax, Einstein was also intended to shake off Sykes's bandages, leap at the dogs, and fling them back into the car. In the final film, Dodger took over Einstein's "two big scenes." Tito, Francis, and Georgette were secondary characters before they were expanded during production. Tito's character's animation footage was increased after those working on the film realized that Tito "shined the way he did." After Cheech Marin was cast as Tito, Tito was given more development, including his relationship with Francis. During recording sessions, Tito's romance with Georgette was also given development.

Rita initially had a bigger role in early drafts, but her role became smaller in the final cut. Oliver's most essential relationship was intended to be with Rita (similar to Oliver and Nancy's relationship in the novel and adaptations), but it was changed to focus on his relationship with Dodger. In early drafts of the film, Rita had an implied relationship with one of Sykes's Dobermanns, who was referred to as "[her] ex". Their encounters included a sexual undertone during the alley scene and a scene where the Dobermanns see Rita turning on the television "with a sexy bash of the hip". Rita was also intended to be murdered like Nancy in the novel and adaptations. In a draft dating September 26, 1985, the writers were deciding whether to kill Rita or not. In a draft dating October 21, 1985, they decided to not kill her. Rita was planned to be injured with bandages, but that, too, was discarded.

In the novel and several adaptations, Oliver's abandonment was in a workhouse. For the film, it was moved to an opening scene that depicted Oliver and the kittens in a box instead of a workhouse. The film's opening was also intended to include Sykes's two Dobermanns murdering Oliver's parents, setting the story to focus on Oliver exacting his revenge as detailed in a draft. At the end of the film, the birthday party was originally for Georgette, but it was later changed to be Jenny's birthday party instead. The scene when Tito gets slapped by Georgette was also intended to appear during the film's ending; it was later moved to an earlier scene.

=== Casting and recording ===
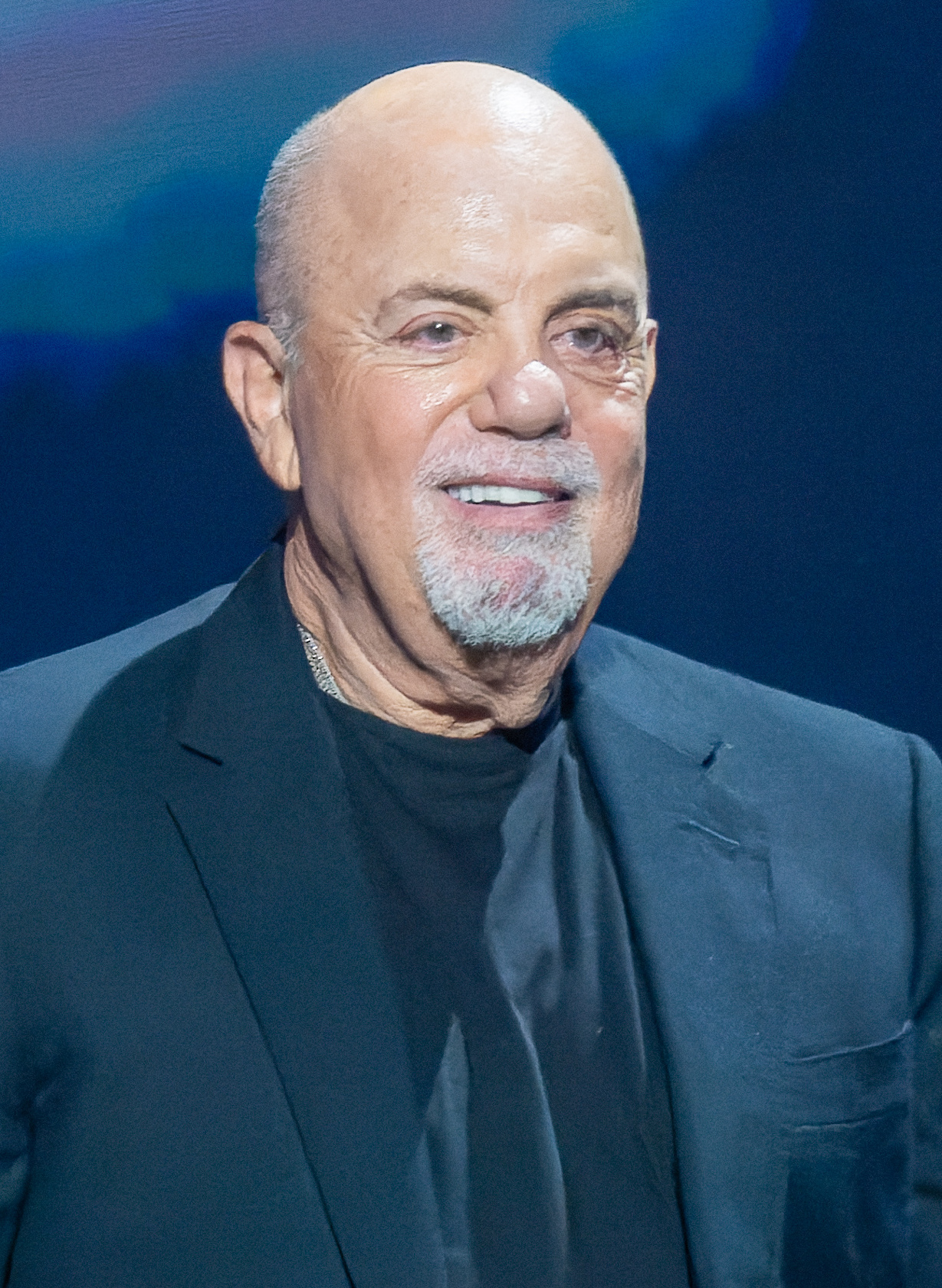
Billy Joel (pictured in 2023) was one of the first actors to be cast in the film, being cast as Dodger in the film.

An open audition was held to find actors that suited the characters' personalities and designs. According to Disney's former senior vice president for feature animation Peter Schneider, it was easy to cast pop music artists because they had children of their own. Scribner and the executives wanted voices that believably represented a wide range of New Yorkers. Under the supervision of Scribner, a lot of recording sessions were held while the film went through several rewrites, causing the voice cast to need to re-record scenes they already done. The cast recorded over two years, with each recording session lasting nearly two to three hours. According to Scribner, the actors enjoyed recording their lines, though some had to be shown early animation tests to know what the characters were doing.

Billy Joel was one of the first actors in the film to be cast and the fifth person to audition for Dodger. Prior to his audition for Dodger, Joel had turned down film roles for many years because he was convinced that "cameras would do terrible things for him." His former wife Christie Brinkley tried to convince Joel that he should act because he might be a good actor, but Joel felt miserable. Joel also received several previous film scripts, but he was not interested. A few years earlier, he was supposed to audition for Sergio Leone for the film Once Upon a Time in America but felt "too scared."

During the film's production, Scribner was told to pick someone who is "New York street-smart" with a "savoir-faire attitude". Joel was recommended by a music director, but Scribner initially had mixed thoughts, questioning whether he could act. Because Joel was residing in New York City at the time, Scribner had to choose whether he was right for the part before auditioning him. Joel auditioned for the role by telephone after being given dialogue, with Scribner as Oliver and Joel as Dodger. When Joel was hired, he was reluctant to perform an animated voice, but Joel wanted his daughter Alexa to relate to something she could see. Joel also loved the "old Disney movies" and Oliver Twist, stating that his grandfather read all of Charles Dickens' novels.

By the time Alexa was born, Joel had started to record his lines. Joel's recording sessions were done at the Power Station, the Hit Factory, and East Hampton Studios in New York City. Others were held during The Bridge Tour in the United States, Canada, the Soviet Union, and other countries. His dialogue was recorded for over two years. Using "method singing", Joel used Leo Gorcey of the Dead End Kids as an inspiration for his character when he started reading the script, acting as the "epitome of a tough kid who deep down was a nice guy." Scribner wanted Joel to "sound like New York", but Joel responded, "Nah, nah. We're between Broadway and Eighth Avenue." Throughout his recording sessions, Joel felt that it was "easier to get into character with each recording session." Joel was also comfortable with his sessions and did not experience them as different from recording his songs. Joel suggested changes to his lines throughout several script rewrites. Joel's final recording session was held in December 1987.

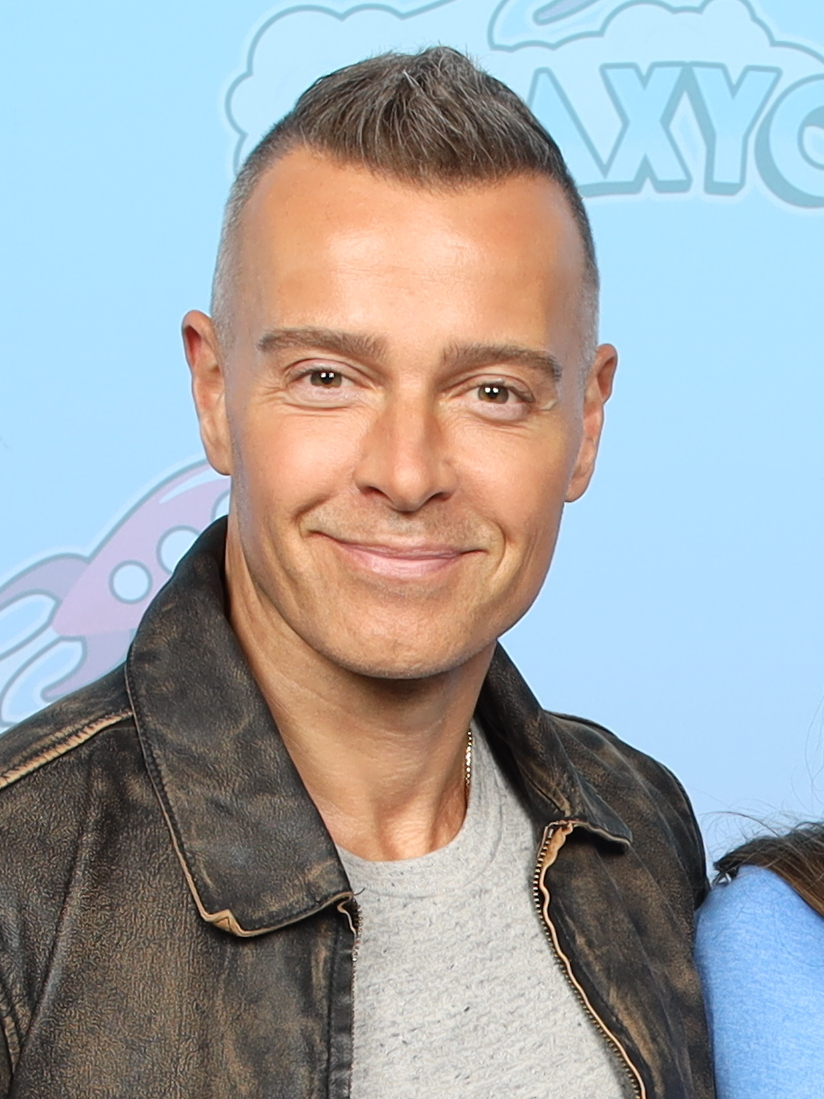
Joey Lawrence (pictured in 2024) voiced Oliver for approximately twenty sessions for two and a half years. His voice deepened as he got older.

Joey Lawrence auditioned at least three or four times, had a callback, and was screen-tested before he was cast. Assigned ten sessions to record his lines for Oliver, by the end, Lawrence had done approximately twenty sessions. Lawrence recorded his dialogue for two and a half years, starting his first session when he was ten years old. Starting his recording sessions with a pre-pubescent voice, his voice deepened over time, causing a struggle to speak in high pitches of his voice. Although Lawrence recorded his lines alone in most of his sessions, he once worked with Joel for approximately three hours. His final recording session was held in February 1988.

Given the desire for a Puerto Rican to be cast as Tito, Marin was the fifth person to audition for the character. Because energy proved to be the key to Tito's personality, Marin was encouraged to ad-lib his lines, but he recorded 75 percent of his lines as written. Marin was assigned four sessions, but it is estimated that he did fifteen sessions for the film. Recording his dialogue for a year, Marin overall felt enthusiastic about his role, stating that he was in a film his child "[could] watch everyday."

In the search for an actress with a "brassy, extroverted voice" for Georgette, 34 actresses auditioned before it was offered to Bette Midler. Tina Turner was initially considered to be the voice of Rita, but Sheryl Lee Ralph was cast as the speaking voice of Rita in the final cut. Ralph recorded her dialogue for a year and six months. William Glover was cast as the Foxworth's family butler, Winston. In 1989, Scribner talked about Glover in an interview, stating, "He was great to work with; he was very professional, and he gave readings you'd never expect."

=== Character designs ===
Andreas Deja and Mike Gabriel were the main character designers of the film. Deja designed the basic look of the characters while Gabriel added extra features to the characters. An animal trainer brought dogs from each of the dogs' breeds to a small area of Walt Disney Feature Animation as a guide for the animators. After the characters were cast, the character models were redesigned to match their vocal performances.

Oliver's character design was based on the kitten from the Mickey Mouse short "Lend a Paw" (1941). Starting off as thin, Dodger's design eventually resembled Joel after his lines were recorded. Tito was animated and designed by directing animator Hendel Butoy. Fagin and Sykes were designed by character animator Glen Keane. Winston was redesigned after Glover recorded his lines, giving the character a slightly heavier stature. His features were also revised, including his head being drawn slightly smaller, his "rear end" becoming slightly larger, and his hands and feet being slightly more delicate. Jenny's character design was changed three or four times.

=== Animation ===
When development began, Scribner initially avoided colloquialisms and references to the period at the time, which were done to avoid Oliver becoming topical and dated. Scribner reversed his decision when he thought that the "feeling that [Oliver] is really occurring" would decline if it was not true to the period, which included the art of New York City and several billboards, advertisements, and etcetera. Scribner borrowed a technique from Lady and the Tramp (1955) by blocking out the scenes on real streets and photographing them with cameras mounted 18 inches (46 cm) off the ground. The animators used the photos as templates to provide a dog's-eye view of the action. Many animators also shot references on videotape and printed them out with a Minolta printer, including animator Leon Joosen, who held a videotape camera and carefully gathered footage on a busy street for the scene where Oliver wakes up and wanders around while being abandoned.

As of April 20, 1988, Oliver & Company was already in the phase of animation. With 119,275 animation cels produced, the traditional animation was handled by a younger generation of Disney animators, including supervising animators Ruben A. Aquino, Butoy, Keane, Gabriel, and Mark Henn, as the "Nine Old Men" had retired in the early 1980s. The characters' movements were based on their actors' movements, which were sketched by artists from videotape recordings of the movements of the actors, including Billy Joel, Cheech Marin, and Joey Lawrence. The walking and running movements of the animals were timed from the animated works of cats and dogs in Lady and the Tramp (1955), One Hundred and One Dalmatians (1961), and The Aristocats (1970), which included work from Ollie Johnston, Marc Davis, Frank Thomas, and Milt Kahl. Preparing to animate humans for The Little Mermaid, animators cited Jenny as the most difficult character to animate, noting that audiences are more critical about the animation of humans than animals.

Eleven minutes of the film used computer-generated imagery (CGI), including Fagin's trike. It was the first animated object to be tested with CGI, consisting of 18 parts.

Using the xeroxgraphic process, backgrounds were made with "very simple washes without an acetate line on the top" to match the main setting and the characters. Skidmore, Owings & Merrill was the database for the New York City skyline, which was recreated for the film. The backgrounds of Jenny's apartment were intended to include gray Xerox lines to balance a distinction between the environment of Fagin's barge and the wharf, and Jenny's apartment, but the idea was discarded.

Michael Cedeno and Tina Price animated eleven minutes of computer-generated imagery (CGI), including the Brooklyn Bridge, cars, cityscapes, construction equipment, Fagin's trike, the interior of the tunnel, the New York City Subway, the stairway scene during "Perfect Isn't Easy", and Sykes's limo. With the backgrounds lined over and painted, the CGI was generated with small pieces and hooked together by a computer with "time-consuming effects". The first object to be tested with CGI was Fagin's trike, consisting of 18 parts.

=== Music ===
Early in production, there was an attempt to involve the music with the film. Scribner wrote a "mental note" to not treat Oliver as a musical where the story would "abruptly stop" and "go into a song." Each song of the film was instead written as an extension of a character. With each song written with a different composer and producer and a different arrangement date, several producers worked on the soundtrack of Oliver & Company. Various songwriters submitted songs in different musical styles, but many of them did not fit with the film's premise and were discarded.

Katzenberg wanted to hire a team of singer-songwriters to provide a song, which included Billy Joel, Barry Manilow, and Huey Lewis. Schneider felt Katzenberg's idea was a wrong way to approach a musical. According to Schneider, The Little Mermaid, which was concurrently in development, was the right approach as the film needed "a unifying score and lyrics." Billy Joel and Bette Midler, who voiced Dodger and Georgette, also performed their characters' songs, "Why Should I Worry?" and "Perfect Isn't Easy".

== Release ==
Oliver & Company premiered at the Ziegfeld Theatre in New York City on November 13, 1988. It was released in the United States on November 18, 1988―the same day on which Disney celebrated the 60th anniversary of the Mickey Mouse short Steamboat Willie (1928). It was also the first to be released as a part of a brand new schedule requested by Katzenberg, which called for a new animated Disney film to be released every single year, similar to Walt Disney's intentions for his animated features during the 1940s.

=== Marketing ===
Oliver & Company was the first Disney animated film to include real-world advertised products. More than 30 company logos and brand names were shown in the film, including Kodak, Dr. Scholls, Sony, Diet Coke, Tab, McDonald's, Yamaha, Ryder, and USA Today. Katzenberg urged the marketing campaign to focus on the classic Dickens novel and pop music score. Sears produced and manufactured products to promote the film, including Oliver & Company-themed clothes that were mailed in Sears's Christmas catalogs prior to the film's release. McDonald's promoted Christmas musical ornaments of Oliver and Dodger and small finger puppets of the characters in a Happy Meal.

For its theatrical re-release in 1996, the film was accompanied with a promotional campaign by Burger King. For the debut home video release, the film was also promoted with consumer rebate and refund offers up to $15 from Kodak, Con Agra Cuisine, and Walt Disney Home Video.

=== Home media ===
Despite its successful box office performance, Oliver & Company was initially not released on home video, and it became one of the most requested Disney films for a home video release. After its theatrical re-release, Oliver & Company was released on VHS and widescreen LaserDisc in the United States on September 24, 1996, for a limited time, selling ten million copies as of 1997. The film was also released on home video in the United Kingdom in 1997.

On May 14, 2002, it was released again on VHS and for the first time on DVD. A 20th Anniversary Edition DVD was released on February 3, 2009, and a 25th Anniversary Edition Blu-ray was released on August 6, 2013. Oliver & Company was available for streaming on Disney+ upon its launch on November 12, 2019.

== Reception ==
=== Box office ===
Oliver & Company and Don Bluth's The Land Before Time opened on the same weekend in the United States and Canada; the latter film debuted at number one grossing $7.5 million in 1,395 theaters while the former opened in fourth place, grossing $4 million in 952 theaters. Nevertheless, Oliver & Company out-grossed The Land Before Time with a total gross in the United States and Canada of $53 million compared to the latter's $46 million. In the United States, the film surpassed Bluth's An American Tail as the highest grossing animated film from its initial run. It was also the first animated film to gross $100 million worldwide in its initial release. The success prompted former Disney animation executive Peter Schneider, to announce the company's plans to release animated features annually.

On March 29, 1996, Disney re-released the film in direct competition with All Dogs Go to Heaven 2, grossing $4.5 million in its opening weekend. It went on to earn $21 million in total taking its lifetime domestic gross to $74 million and its worldwide total to over $121 million.

=== Critical response ===
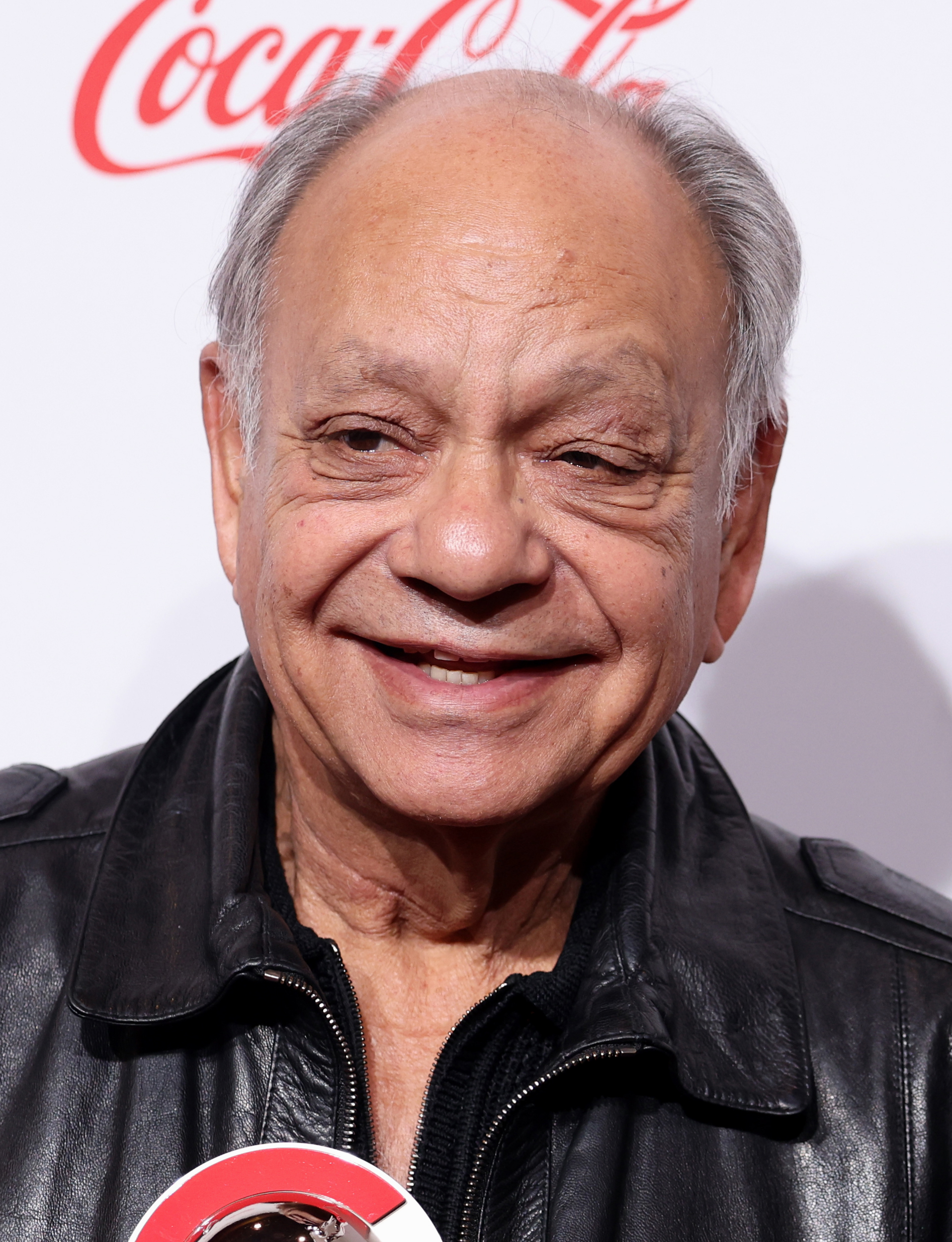
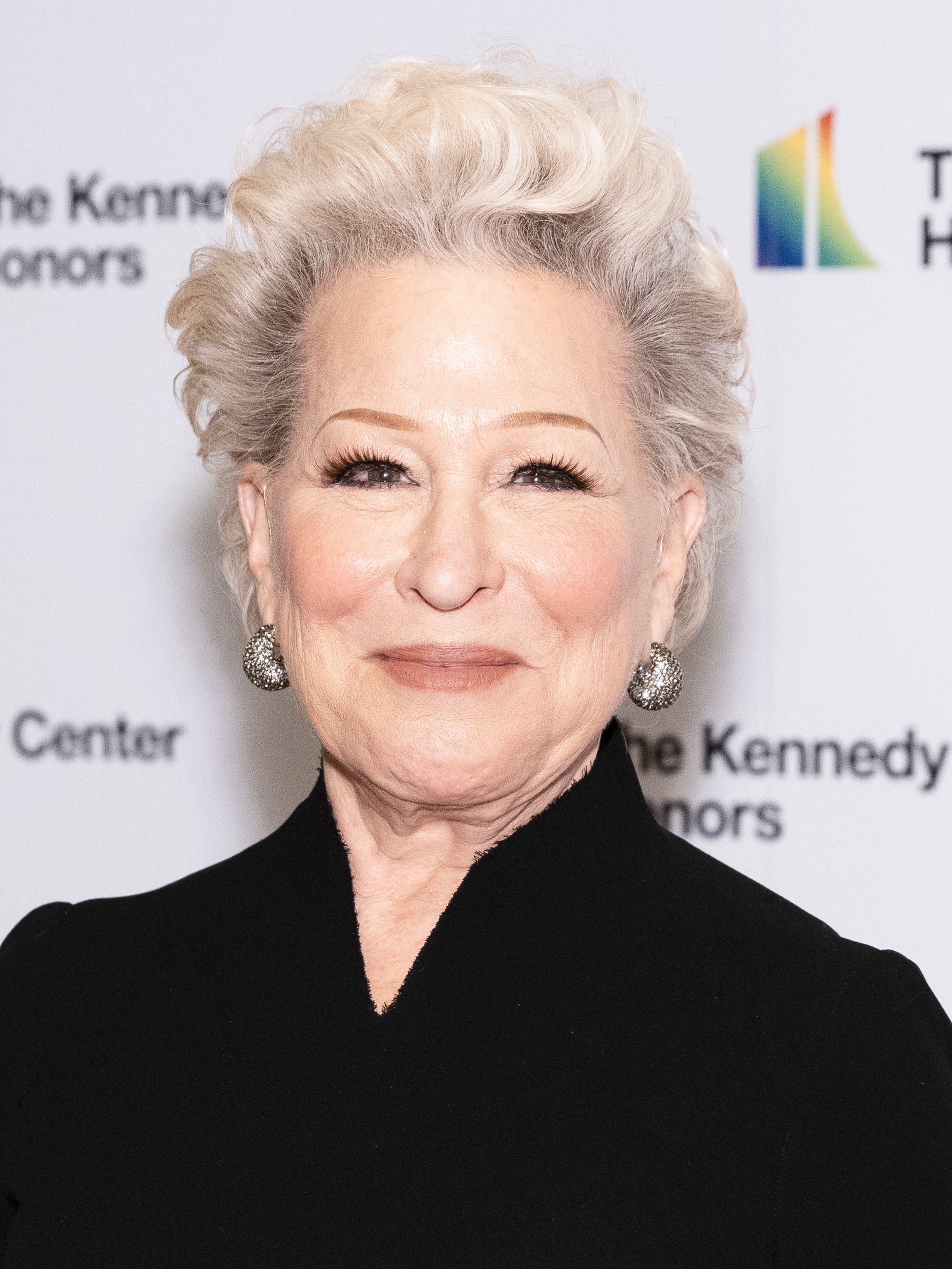
Cheech Marin (pictured in 2025) and Bette Midler (pictured in 2021) received critical acclaim for their vocal performances as Tito and Georgette.

Upon its theatrical releases in 1988 and 1996, Oliver & Company received polarized reviews from critics. The review aggregator website Rotten Tomatoes reported that 52% of critics gave the film positive reviews based on 56 reviews. Its consensus states, "Predictable and stodgy, Oliver & Company isn't one of Disney's best, though its colorful cast of characters may be enough to entertain young viewers looking for a little adventure." On Metacritic, the film has a score of 58 out of 100, based on 15 critics, indicating "mixed or average" reviews.

The music received nearly widespread acclaim from critics. Many critics, such as Joe Baltake of The Sacramento Bee, Desson Howe and Rita Kempley of The Washington Post, Bob Ross of The Tampa Tribune, and Ben Yagoda of Philadelphia Daily News, described the songs as catchy, delightful, and sappy. Beth Dunlop of The Miami Herald praised the range of the music, while Jack Daugherty of Record-Journal commended it as "one of the most contagious musical scores of any of Disney movie in recent memory." In a less favorable review, Andy Seiler of Home News Tribune said that the songs "rang[ed] from decent to the putrid".

"Why Should I Worry?" by Billy Joel and "Perfect Isn't Easy" by Bette Midler received universal acclaim. Many critics commended "Why Should I Worry?" and picked the song as a highlight, (Note: Critics include Vincent Canby of The New York Times, Lin Connery of Calgary Herald, Linda Cook of Quad-City Times, Jack Daugherty of Record-Journal, Malcolm L. Johnson of Hartford Courant, Bruce R. Miller of The Sioux City Journal, and Jeff Strickler of Star Tribune.) with Howe picking it as the catchiest song in the film. Others, such as Dave Jewett of The Columbian and Gannett News Service, either reviewed that the song sounded like Joel's "next hit" or deserved to become a single. Critics lauded "Perfect Isn't Easy" for being a show-stopper, deeming the song funny, memorable, and petulant. Other songs in the film were also highlighted. Along with "Why Should I Worry?", Malcolm L. Johnson of Hartford Courant described "Once Upon a Time in New York City" by Huey Lewis as a "boffo opening number". Bruce R. Miller of The Sioux City Journal also praised "Once Upon a Time in New York City", considering it an Academy Award contender. Strickler highlighted "Streets of Gold" by Ruth Pointer as one of the other songs that "stood out" in the film.

Most critics praised the vocal performances by celebrities. Joel's vocal performance as Dodger was generally praised. Animation historian Charles Solomon of The Los Angeles Times and Peter Travers of People praised his performance for giving depth, essence, and tension. Ross commented that Joel played as Dodger "perfectly", highlighting "his New York accent and wise-guy attitude." However, Miller criticized his vocal performance for having "no real character quirk or a storyline that deserves someone of Joel's caliber," declaring it as the biggest disappointment of the film. Marin's vocal performance as Tito received acclaim, with many critics highlighting his vocal performance. (Note: Critics include Vincent Canby of The New York Times, Jack Daugherty of Record-Journal, animation historian Charles Solomon of The Los Angeles Times, Peter Travers of People, and Ben Yagoda of Philadelphia Daily News.) Miller commended his vocal performance for "giv[ing] life" and twists to the character, while Connery and Glenn Lovell of Knight-Ridder deemed it flawless and perfectly matched. Baltake and Lovell (along with Dom DeLuise's performance as Fagin) ranked it as the best vocal performance in the film. Midler's vocal performance as Georgette also received acclaim. Many critics highlighted Midler's performance, particularly in the musical number "Perfect Isn't Easy", with a few critics finding Midler's voice impression of Georgette similar to Ethel Merman. Vocal performances of other cast members were also highlighted, including Lawrence as Oliver, Robert Loggia as Sykes, DeLuise as Fagin, Ralph as Rita, Roscoe Lee Browne as Francis, and Richard Mulligan as Einstein.

The animation, designs, and the film's use of computer-generated imagery received mixed reviews. In positive reviews, some reviewers praised the animation for its details and style, including the backgrounds, characters, and the New York City setting. Others, such as Vincent Canby of The New York Times, Johnson, and TV Guide, found the animation superior to Saturday-morning cartoons and other animated television shows. Miller also lauded the computer-generated imagery in the musical number "Why Should I Worry?". In negative reviews, reviewers found the animation uninspired, with some dismissing the animation and backgrounds as bland, cheap, ugly, and uninviting. Lovell highlighted the inconsistency of the animation, noting that the scene located at the barge "manages the texture and rowdy appeal of some of Disney's animated triumphs", but it became "sketchier and more impressionistic" in scenes featuring the streets and the Foxworth's house. TV Guide found the computer-generated imagery "relatively stiff and inexpressive".

The film's plot also received mixed reviews, with many critics finding the storytelling "witless". In a divided review, Canby panned the screenplay as "not great", but deemed it serviceable enough to allow the cast to express their distinctive personalities. In less complimentary reviews, Johnson and Lovell commented that the story begins to decline in quality throughout the film. Johnson cited that after "Why Should I Worry?", the film begins to "sink into mediocrity", while Lovell stated that the story "begins to tread water" in the scenes located in streets and the Foxworth's house. Walters lamented the "uninvolving" story, highlighting that the "only interesting aspect of the story is how the dogs through their playfully deviant nature tell kids it's [okay] to steal as long as your motives are good and you do it with style." In favorable reviews, Baltake lauded the story as "one of the liviest for a Disney [animated film] since [One Hundred and One Dalmatians]." Scott A. May of Columbia Daily Tribune commended the story as appealing to a younger audience. Ross reviewed that the story "moves riotously if not smartly."

In 1991, film historian Bob Thomas wrote that some of the Disney animators he interviewed unfavorably viewed the film as "another talking dog-and-cat movie." Nell Minow of Common Sense Media gave the film three out of five stars, commenting that the film "has some scary moments, but kids will appreciate the way that Oliver takes care of himself and the way that the dogs take care of him, each other, and their human friend, the hapless Fagin."

=== Accolades ===
Award	Category	Result
Golden Globes	Best Original Song	Nominated
Young Artist Award	Best Family Feature Film – Animation	Nominated
Golden Reel Awards	Best Sound Editing	Won

== Legacy ==
Like other Disney animated characters, the characters of the film have recurring cameo appearances in the television series House of Mouse. In the episode "Pluto Saves the Day", Dodger (voiced by Jess Harnell instead of Billy Joel) leads a musical group known as Pet Shop Dogs, formed by other dogs of Disney animated films, also including Tito, Francis and DeSoto, performing the song "Everybody Wants to Be a Woof" (a parody of the song "Everybody Wants to Be a Cat" from The Aristocats).

Despite not being among Disney's most fondly remembered films, Oliver & Company has been retrospectively regarded by some critics as a precursor to the Disney Renaissance, owing to its commercial success and integration of musical numbers. In animation historian Jerry Beck's book The Animated Movie Guide, contributor Martin Goodman wrote that the film "represented the studio's final dress rehearsal for the great successes of the 1990s". Brett White of Decider said that the film did exactly what The Little Mermaid (1989) would eventually do for the studio, albeit "a year earlier—just not on as spectacular of a scale". White attributed the film's frequent oversight to its being overshadowed by the following year's The Little Mermaid, competition from other animation studios, and Disney's decision not to release the film on home video until 1996. Animation World Network's Rick DeMott observed that Oliver & Company employed many of the same creatives who would go on to work on much of Disney's Renaissance output, writing that, while the film was not "a classic out the gate", it moved the studio in the direction it needed to go. According to Jesse Hassenger of PopMatters, many of Oliver & Company's elements would become staples of family-oriented animation, influencing not only Disney but also studios such as DreamWorks and Blue Sky Animation through its use of pop-oriented musical numbers, celebrity voice casting, and computer animation. Josh Spiegel of SlashFilm observed that, in addition to its contemporary setting, Oliver & Company heavily features modern-day references in a way few Disney films had done before. This representation of contemporary pop culture would eventually become commonplace in animation, ranging from its music and jokes to its casting, locations and establishing shots, and use of brand names and logos. In 2025, Bradley Russell of GamesRadar+ argued that the film deserves to be reappraised as a modern Disney classic.

The film's voice cast is notable for featuring well-known A-list celebrities of the time, a form of stunt casting that was uncommon for animated films and would later become commonplace in the medium. Critics such as Mari Ness have noted that Disney's marketing used the celebrities' names to attract older audiences who would be familiar with their work, and have drawn parallels between Joel's casting and that of Robin Williams in Aladdin (1992).

Along with other Walt Disney Animation Studios characters, the characters of the film have cameo appearances in the 2023 short film Once Upon a Studio.

== Bibliography ==
=== Books ===
- Beck, Jerry (October 28, 2005). The Animated Movie Guide (1st ed.). Chicago: A Cappella Books (Chicago Review Press). ISBN 1-55652-591-5 – via Google Books.
- Finch, Christopher (2004). Danese, Andrea (ed.). The Art of Walt Disney: From Mickey Mouse to the Magic Kingdoms. New York City: Harry N. Abrams. ISBN 0-8109-4964-4 – via Internet Archive.
- Gritten, David (2007). "Oliver and Company (*)". Halliwell's Film Guide 2008. Hammersmith, London: HarperCollins. p. 871. ISBN 978-0-00-726080-5.
- Hulett, Steve (2014). Mouse In Transition: An Insider's Look at Disney Feature Animation. Theme Park Press. ISBN 978-1-941-50024-8.
- Koenig, David (1997). Mouse Under Glass: Secrets of Disney Animation & Theme Parks. Irvine, California: Bonaventure Press. ISBN 978-0-964-06051-7 – via Internet Archive.
- Miller, Marc (2000). "Of Tunes and Toons: The Movie Musical in the 1990s". In Dixon, Wheeler W. (ed.). Film Genre 2000: New Critical Essays (Hardcover ed.). Albany, New York: State University of New York Press. ISBN 0-7914-4513-5 – via Internet Archive.
- Stewart, James (2005). DisneyWar. New York City: Simon & Schuster. ISBN 0-684-80993-1 – via Internet Archive.
- Thomas, Bob (1991). Disney's Art of Animation: From Mickey Mouse to Beauty and the Beast. New York City: Hyperion. p. 117. ISBN 1-56282-899-1 – via Internet Archive.

=== News, journals, and magazines ===
- Alsop, Ronald J. (1997). "Top Selling Videos in 1996". The Wall Street Journal Almanac 1998. New York City: Ballantine Books: 914.
- McCracken, Harry (1989). "Once Upon a Time in New York City: An Interview with George Scribner, Director of Oliver & Company". Animato!. No. 18. Cambridge, Massachusetts. pp. 20–25. ISSN 1042-539X – via Internet Archive.
- Fleming, Patrick C. (2016). "Dickens, Disney, Oliver, and Company: Adaptation in a Corporate Media Age". Children's Literature Association Quarterly. Vol. 41, no. 2. Baltimore, Maryland: Johns Hopkins University Press. pp. 182–198. ISSN 0885-0429. ProQuest 1813155689.

=== Video media ===
- George Scribner (director), Roy E. Disney (Former Vice Chairman of The Walt Disney Company), Glen Keane (supervising animator), and various cast and crew members (December 4, 1988). The Making of Oliver & Company (Video).
- Jeffrey Katzenberg (Former Chairman of The Walt Disney Company), Roy E. Disney (Former Vice Chairman of The Walt Disney Company), Peter Schneider (Former Senior Vice President of Walt Disney Animation Studios), Glen Keane (supervising animator), and various cast members and crew (December 4, 1988). Behind-the-Scenes featurette of Oliver & Company (Television production). The Magical World of Disney. All duration timings of citations for this source were written from a YouTube video titled The Making of Oliver and Company, which was published on December 29, 2008.
