= Deaths in October 2024 =

The following is a list of notable deaths in October 2024.

Entries for each day are listed alphabetically by surname. A typical entry lists information in the following sequence:

- Name, age, country of citizenship at birth, subsequent country of citizenship (if applicable), reason for notability, cause of death (if known), and reference.

== October 2024 ==
=== 1 ===
- Michael Ancram, 13th Marquess of Lothian, 79, British politician and peer, three-time MP, member of the House of Lords (since 2010).
- Gudbrand Bakken, 83, Norwegian veterinarian and civil servant.
- Jean-Claude Bourbault, 79, French actor (Les Uns et les Autres, Paris Lockdown).
- David Burnham, 91, American journalist (The New York Times), choking.
- Kerry Burt, 59, American politician, member of the Iowa House of Representatives (2009–2011).
- Ensan Case, 74, American novelist (Wingmen).
- Stephan Dabbert, 66, German academic and agricultural economist.
- Denílson, 81, Brazilian footballer (Fluminense, national team).
- Vyacheslav Dobrynin, 78, Russian composer and singer, stroke.
- Herold Driedger, 82, Canadian politician, Manitoba MLA (1988–1990).
- Zenón Franco Ocampos, 68, Paraguayan chess grandmaster.
- Alford Gardner, 98, Jamaican-born British emigrant and historical adviser (Windrush generation), bowel cancer.
- Graeme Gunn, 91, Australian architect.
- Maurice Henrie, 87, Canadian writer and academic.
- Dina Kathelyn, 90, Belgian comic book illustrator.
- Liu Bin, 88, Chinese politician.
- Milton Thiago de Mello, 108, Brazilian primatologist.
- Francesco Merloni, 99, Italian industrialist and politician, minister of public works (1992–1994), deputy (1976–1992, 1996–2001) and twice senator.
- Luis Olivares, 84, Chilean footballer (Universidad Católica, Deportes Temuco).
- Rastislav Trtík, 63, Czech handball player and coach.
- A. R. Frank Wazzan, 88, American academic.
- Garcia White, 61, American serial killer, execution by lethal injection.
- Dennis Woodruff, 72, American actor, director and producer.
- Bob Yerkes, 92, American stuntman (Back to the Future, Return of the Jedi, Hook), complications from pneumonia.
- Edwin Zimmermann, 76, German engineer and politician.

=== 2 ===
- Josefa de Bastavales, 92, Spanish tambourine player.
- Christopher Charles Benninger, 81, American-born Indian architect, cancer.
- Susie Berning, 83, American Hall of Fame golfer, U.S. Women's Open champion (1968, 1972, 1973), lung cancer.
- Guido Carlesi, 87, Italian racing cyclist.
- Jason Cirone, 53, Canadian-Italian ice hockey player (Winnipeg Jets), cancer.
- Anne Clifford, 80, American feminist theologian.
- Mary Helen Goldsmith, 91, American plant physiologist.
- Marissa Haque, 61, Indonesian actress and politician, member of the House of Representatives (2004–2006).
- Rüdiger Henning, 80, German rower, Olympic champion (1968).
- Modou Jadama, 30, Gambian footballer (Tulsa Roughnecks, Portland Timbers 2, Hartford Athletic).
- Liakat Kablay, Motswana politician, MP (since 2009).
- Gerald Kember, 78, New Zealand rugby union player (Wellington, national team).
- Midkhat Khakimov, 84, Russian politician, MP (2000–2003).
- Gérard Leleu, 92, French doctor and sexologist.
- Matthew Lewis, 94, American photojournalist (The Washington Post), Pulitzer Prize winner (1975).
- Roger K. Lewis, 83, American architect and urban planner.
- Megan Marshack, 70, American television news writer and producer, liver and kidney failure.
- Arbogaste Mbella Ntone, 82, Cameroonian singer.
- Solly Moholo, 65, South African gospel singer, stroke.
- Herman Ouseley, Baron Ouseley, 79, Guyanese-born British civil rights activist and politician, member of the House of Lords (2001–2019).
- Dnyaneshwar Patil, Indian politician, Maharashtra MLA (1995–2004).
- Bruce Peloquin, 87, American businessman and politician, member of the Wisconsin State Assembly (1965–1971) and Senate (1971–1979).
- Daniel Pinard, 81–82, Canadian radio and television presenter (Ciel, mon Pinard!), pulmonary embolism.
- Emily Richard, 76, British actress (The Life and Adventures of Nicholas Nickleby, The Cleopatras, The Dark Side of the Sun).
- Jacques Roy, 89, Canadian lawyer and diplomat, ambassador to the European Union (1994–1996) and to France (1996–2000).
- Martin Schröder, 93, Dutch pilot and businessman, founder of Martinair.
- Ken Tobias, 79, Canadian singer-songwriter ("Stay Awhile"), brain cancer.
- Francisco Tomey, 78, Spanish politician, senator (1986–1989, 1993–2000), deputy (1989–1993).
- Elizabeth Tori, 88, American politician, member of the Kentucky Senate (1995–2011).
- Sir David Varney, 78, British public servant, chairman of HM Revenue and Customs (2005–2006), pulmonary embolism.
- Larry Watkins, 77, American politician, member of the Mississippi House of Representatives (1992–1993).
- Sir Daniel Williams, 88, Grenadian politician and lawyer, governor-general (1996–2008).
- Richard Woodman, 80, English novelist and naval historian, cancer.
- Jonathan Zwingina, 70, Nigerian politician, senator (1999–2007).

=== 3 ===
- Mijo Beccaria, 90, French editor.
- Terje Bjørklund, 79, Norwegian jazz pianist and composer.
- Michel Blanc, 72, French film director (Grosse fatigue, Summer Things) and actor (Marche à l'ombre), heart attack.
- Saturnino Braga, 93, Brazilian politician, two-time deputy, senator (1975–1986), mayor of Rio de Janeiro (1986–1989).
- Carlos Brosas, 68, Filipino Olympic swimmer (1972).
- Pierre Christin, 86, French comics writer (Valérian and Laureline).
- Jack Colwell, 34, Australian singer and songwriter.
- Lino Falzon, 83, Maltese footballer (Sliema Wanderers, national team).
- SuEllen Fried, 92, American bullying prevention activist and writer.
- Yeshayahu Gavish, 99, Israeli major general.
- John Gierach, 78, American author, heart attack.
- Charles Klusmann, 91, American fighter pilot.
- Neil Lewthwaite, 85, Australian footballer (South Melbourne).
- Lilibert, 100, Luxembourgish lyricist ("Memphis, Tennessee").
- Fiona MacDonald, 67, Australian television presenter (Wombat, It's a Knockout), complications from motor neurone disease.
- Abdul Majeed Mahir, 96, Maldivian political activist.
- Cid Moreira, 97, Brazilian television journalist (Jornal Nacional).
- Rawhi Mushtaha, Palestinian militant and founding member of Hamas. (death announced on this date)
- Mary O'Rourke, 87, Irish politician, TD (1982–2002, 2007–2011) and two-time senator.
- Dorothy Pocklington, 90, American brigadier general.
- Mohan Raj, 72, Indian actor (Kireedam, Mimics Parade, Customs Diary).
- Hashem Safieddine, 60, Lebanese Shia cleric, airstrike.
- David Shaw, 71, American football player (Hamilton Tiger-Cats, Winnipeg Blue Bombers).
- Siegfried, 51, French film director and composer (For Sale, Louise (Take 2), Sansa).
- Emil Skamene, 83, Polish-born Canadian immunologist.
- Bob Speake, 94, American baseball player (Chicago Cubs, San Francisco Giants).

=== 4 ===
- Ian Affleck, 72, Canadian physicist.
- Amarilys Alméstica, 43, Puerto Rican hammer thrower.
- Leah Rawls Atkins, 89, American historian.
- Barbara Blackman, 95, Australian writer and philanthropist.
- Allan Blye, 87, Canadian-born American television writer (The Smothers Brothers Comedy Hour, The Sonny & Cher Comedy Hour) and actor (Mister Rogers' Neighborhood).
- Chazom Chazom, 76, Israeli footballer (Hapoel Petah Tikva, Hapoel Yehud, Hapoel Ramat Gan Givatayim).
- Christopher Ciccone, 63, American dancer and interior designer, pancreatic cancer.
- Willi Giesemann, 87, German footballer (Hamburger SV, HSV Barmbek-Uhlenhorst, West Germany national team).
- Vilmosné Gryllus, 100, Hungarian chemist.
- Daniel Guimarães, 37, Brazilian footballer (Mogi Mirim, América de Natal, Nacional), cancer.
- Ayşenur Halil, 19, Turkish woman, decapitated.
- Yukio Hattori, 78, Japanese television personality (Iron Chef) and food critic.
- John Henderson, 91, Canadian ice hockey player (Boston Bruins, Whitby Dunlops).
- Takeshi Inomata, 88, Japanese jazz drummer and bandleader.
- Samson Kandie, 53, Kenyan long-distance runner, beaten.
- Anatoliy Konkov, 75, Ukrainian football player (Shahktar Donetsk, Dynamo Kyiv) and manager (national team).
- Laurent Lachance, 93, Canadian linguist, author, and program creator (Passe-Partout).
- Greg Landry, 77, American football player and coach (Detroit Lions, Chicago Bears).
- John Lasell, 95, American actor (Dark Shadows, The F.B.I, The Fugitive).
- Marcelle Maritz, 59, South African politician, member of the Limpopo Provincial Legislature (since 2019).
- Petar Matić Dule, 104, Serbian army colonel general, politician and World War II veteran, last living People's Hero of Yugoslavia.
- Lourdes Mendoza, 66, Peruvian politician, second vice president (2006–2011) and deputy (2006–2011), heart attack.
- John Lawrence O'Meally, 84, Australian judge.
- Harold Palmer, 93, British religious hermit.
- Marlon Pérez Arango, 48, Colombian Olympic cyclist (1996, 2000, 2004), stabbed.
- Lea Pericoli, 89, Italian tennis player.
- Emiliano Queiroz, 88, Brazilian actor (Madame Satã, Xuxa e os Duendes, A Wolf at the Door).
- O. R. Ramachandran, 77, Indian politician, Tamil Nadu MLA (1991–2006).
- Billy Shaw, 85, American Hall of Fame football player (Buffalo Bills), hyponatremia.
- İkbal Uzuner, 19, Turkish woman, killed.
- Toni Vaz, 101, American stuntwoman and founder of NAACP Image Awards.
- Ye Minghan, 99, Chinese physicist, member of the Chinese Academy of Engineering.

=== 5 ===
- Bruce Ames, 95, American biochemist, complications from a fall.
- Donald L. Barlett, 88, American investigative journalist and non-fiction writer.
- Sammy Basso, 28, Italian biologist and writer, heart attack.
- Helmut Bauer, 91, German Roman Catholic prelate, auxiliary bishop of Würzburg (1988–2008).
- A. Q. M. Badruddoza Chowdhury, 93, Bangladeshi politician, president (2001–2002), minister of foreign affairs (2001), and deputy prime minister (1979), lung infection.
- Robert Coover, 92, American author (The Public Burning, Gerald's Party, A Political Fable).
- Ildar Dadin, 42, Russian anti-Kremlin political activist, combat injuries.
- Timothy Darvill, 66, English archaeologist, cancer.
- James DeFelice, 87, American-Canadian actor, playwright and screenwriter (Why Shoot the Teacher?, Angel Square).
- Doc Harris, 76, Canadian radio broadcaster (CKLG, CKNW) and voice actor (Dragon Ball Z).
- Patrick M. Hughes, 82 American army general, director of the Defense Intelligence Agency (1996-1999).
- Jack Iker, 75, American Anglican clergyman, bishop of Fort Worth (1995–2009).
- Kordian Jajszczok, 74, Polish Olympic ice hockey player (1976).
- Jeong Hui-gyeong, 92, South Korean academic and politician, MP (1996–2000).
- Sunaina Kejriwal, 53, Indian art curator, cancer.
- Naima Lamcharki, 81, Moroccan actress (Casablanca, Nest of Spies, Blood Wedding).
- Alexander Leitch, Baron Leitch, 76, British businessman and life peer, member of the House of Lords (since 2004), leukaemia.
- Beverly Turner Lynds, 95, American astronomer, complications from a stroke.
- Ifigenia Martínez y Hernández, 99, Mexican politician and diplomat, senator (1988–1991, 2018–2024), president (since 2024) and four-time member of the chamber of deputies.
- Werner Merzbacher, 96, Swiss-American businessman.
- Roy Miki, 82, Canadian poet, scholar, and editor.
- Peter Ogilvie, 52, Canadian Olympic sprinter (1992, 1996).
- John Corbett O'Meara, 90, American jurist, judge of the U.S. District Court for Eastern Michigan (since 1994).
- Vladimir Piskunov, 83, Russian businessman and politician, member of the Soviet of Nationalities (1984–1989).
- Mimis Plessas, 99, Greek composer and pianist.
- Mohammed Sabir, 84, Pakistani-born British businessman.
- Maksim Samoylov, 43, Russian footballer (FC Izhevsk, FC SOYUZ-Gazprom Izhevsk), heart attack.
- Tefko Saracevic, 93, Croatian-born American information scientist.
- Tepin, 12, American Hall of Fame racehorse. (death announced on this date)
- Shambhuji Thakor, 74, Indian politician, Gujarat MLA (2007–2022).
- Giorgio Trevisan, 89, Italian comic artist (War Picture Library, Ken Parker, Julia).
- Ilaitia Tuisese, 77, Fijian rugby union player (national team) and politician, MP (2001–2014).
- Tadashi Ushijima, 93, Japanese economist and politician, member of the House of Councillors (1992–1998).
- Pavla Vošahlíková, 73, Czech historian.
- Maria Weimer, 45, German-born Swedish diplomat and politician, MP (2014–2018).

=== 6 ===
- Alejandro Arcos, 43, Mexican politician, member of the Congress of Guerrero (2012–2015), mayor of Chilpancingo (since 2024).
- Kipyegon Bett, 26, Kenyan middle-distance runner, renal and hepatic failure.
- Alan N. Bloch, 92, American jurist, judge of the U.S. District Court for Western Pennsylvania (since 1979).
- Sefedin Braho, 71, Albanian footballer (Luftëtari, Partizani, national team).
- Dominic Cossa, 89, American operatic baritone.
- Dan Coughlin, 86, American sportscaster (WJW) and journalist (Cleveland Plain Dealer).
- Emo Danesi, 89, Italian politician, deputy (1976–1983).
- Michael de Pencier, 89, Canadian magazine publisher (Toronto Life).
- Laine Erik, 82, Estonian Olympic middle-distance runner (1964).
- Adriano Garsia, 96, Tunisian-born American mathematician.
- Joseph Giarratano, 67, American pardoned death row inmate.
- Neil Grabois, 88, American mathematician and academic administrator, president of Colgate University (1988–1999).
- Minas Hadjimichael, 67, Cypriot diplomat, injuries sustained from a traffic collision.
- Dave Hobson, 87, American politician, member of the U.S. House of Representatives (1991–2009) and Ohio Senate (1982–1991).
- Ronald A. Howard, 90, American engineer.
- Shimon Kagan, 82, Israeli chess player.
- Claude Lapointe, 85, French illustrator and teacher.
- Johnny Neel, 70, American musician (The Allman Brothers Band), heart failure.
- Johan Neeskens, 73, Dutch football player (Ajax, Barcelona, national team) and manager, heart attack.
- Sam Shaw, 78, American sound engineer (Star Wars, ...And Justice for All, Tales of the Gold Monkey), BAFTA winner (1979), sepsis.
- Hugh Patrick Slattery, 90, Irish Roman Catholic prelate, bishop of Tzaneen (1984–2010).
- Edna Tepava, 69, French beauty pageant contestant, Miss Tahiti (1973), Miss France (1974).
- Tolen Toktasynov, 61, Kazakh politician, MP (2000–2004).
- Géjza Valent, 71, Czech Olympic discus thrower (1988).
- Ernie Vincze, 81, Hungarian-born British cinematographer (Doctor Who, A Very British Coup, Holby City).

=== 7 ===
- Iona Andronov, 90, Russian journalist and politician, deputy (1990–1993).
- Humaira Asghar, 40, Pakistani actress, model and theatre artist. (estimated death on this date)
- Amaury du Closel, 68, French composer and conductor.
- Hugh Cholmondeley, 5th Baron Delamere, 90, British peer, member of the House of Lords (1979–1999).
- Gladys Mary Coles, 89, British poet and novelist.
- Franz Dengg, 95, German Olympic ski jumper (1952).
- Donald B. Elliott, 92, American politician, member of the Maryland House of Delegates (1987–2015).
- Du Yaxiong, 79, Chinese ethnomusicologist.
- John Elward, 89, Australian rules footballer (Hawthorn).
- Tahir Emra, 86, Albanian painter.
- Robbie Fitzgibbon, 28, British middle-distance runner.
- Emilio Gabaglio, 87, Italian trade unionist, president of the ACLI (1969–1972), general secretary of the ETUC (1991–2003).
- Claude Gewerc, 77, French politician, mayor of Clermont, Oise (2001–2004).
- Frank Hagel, 90, American painter.
- Brian Hastings, 84, New Zealand cricketer (Canterbury, national team).
- Hans van Hemert, 79, Dutch music producer (Luv', Mouth and MacNeal) and songwriter ("How Do You Do"), prostate cancer.
- Cissy Houston, 91, American singer (The Sweet Inspirations) and actress (The Preacher's Wife), Grammy winner (1997, 1999), complications from Alzheimer's disease.
- Leonard J. Jacobs, 96, American politician, member of the North Dakota House of Representatives (1993–1998).
- Sultan bin Mohammed Al Kabeer, 70, Saudi prince and food industry executive, co-founder of Almarai.
- Clement Kemboi, 32, Kenyan middle-distance runner, suicide by hanging.
- Arie L. Kopelman, 86, American businessman and philanthropist, president of Chanel (1986–2004), pancreatic cancer.
- Georg Krücken, 62, German sociologist, cancer.
- Recai Kutan, 94, Turkish politician, minister of energy and natural resources (1996–1997) and construction and settlement (1977–1978).
- James J. McMonagle, 92, American major general.
- Harald Arnljot Øye, 89, Norwegian chemist.
- Jack Ponti, 66, American songwriter ("Hey Stoopid", "Love's a Loaded Gun") and record producer.
- Nicholas Pryor, 89, American actor (Beverly Hills, 90210, Port Charles, Risky Business), cancer.
- Lore Segal, 96, Austrian-American novelist, heart failure.
- Ian Shipsey, 65, British experimental particle physicist.
- John Arthur Smith, 83, American politician, member of the New Mexico Senate (1989–2020).
- Elhanan Tannenbaum, 78, Polish-born Israeli hostage.
- Üner Teoman, 91, Turkish Olympic sprinter (1948).
- Mario Enrique del Toro, 58, Mexican politician, member of the Chamber of Deputies (2006–2009).
- Zaw Myint Maung, 72, Burmese politician and political prisoner, chief minister of Mandalay Region (2016–2021), leukemia.

=== 8 ===
- Jorge Arriagada, 81, Chilean-French film composer (The Women on the 6th Floor, Bicycling with Molière, The Insomniac on the Bridge).
- Ira B. Bernstein, 99, American theoretical physicist.
- Verna L. Clayton, 87, American politician, member of the Illinois House of Representatives (1992–1998).
- Delta Blues, 23, Japanese Thoroughbred horse, Melbourne Cup winner (2006), laminitis.
- Alexandra Martine Diengo Lumbayi, 21, Congolese student. (body discovered on this date)
- Pat Fischer, 84, American football player (St. Louis Cardinals, Washington Redskins).
- Ron Glasgow, 93, Scottish rugby union player (Glasgow District, North and Midlands, national team).
- John Gow, 78, Canadian para-alpine skier and resort executive, Paralympic champion (1976).
- Richard F. Grein, 91, American Episcopal clergyman, bishop of New York (1989−2001).
- Frank Habicht, 85, German-born New Zealand photographer.
- R. Phillip Haire, 88, American politician, member of the North Carolina House of Representatives (1999–2013).
- George Hampel, 91, Australian barrister and judge, justice of the Supreme Court of Victoria (1983–2000).
- Elisabeth Harvor, 88, Canadian writer.
- Joseph Haydar, 85, Australian Olympic weightlifter (1964).
- Jade, c. 8, New Zealand sea lion. (body discovered on this date)
- Job, 96, Swiss comics artist (Yakari).
- Tim Johnson, 77, American politician, member of the U.S. House of Representatives (1987–1997) and Senate (1997–2015), stroke.
- Fakhri Kawar, 79, Jordanian writer and politician, member of the house of representatives (1989–1993).
- Monique Knowlton, 87, German-born American model.
- Jerzy Lewandowski, 65, Polish theoretical physicist.
- Ma Yongwei, 82, Chinese banker and politician, president of the China Insurance Regulatory Commission (1998–2002).
- Donnie Marshall, 92, Canadian ice hockey player (Montreal Canadiens, New York Rangers, Buffalo Sabres), complications from COVID-19.
- Ray McCauley, 75, South African religious leader.
- Maxine Mimms, 96, American educator (Evergreen State College).
- Elio Mosele, 90, Italian politician, president of the Province of Verona (2004–2009).
- Michael A. Nelson, 87, American lieutenant general.
- Omar Palma, 66, Argentine football player (Rosario Central, C.D. Veracruz) and manager (Central Córdoba), complications from a stroke.
- Gerulfus Kherubim Pareira, 83, Indonesian Roman Catholic prelate, bishop of Weetebula (1985–2008) and Maumere (2008–2018).
- Sir Geoffrey Pattie, 88, British politician, MP (1974–1997).
- Dominique Quéhec, 87, French actor and stage director.
- Abdul Salaam, 71, American football player (New York Jets).
- Mariam Sissoko, 79, Malian socialite, first lady (1968–1991).
- Rein Tamme, 84, Estonian politician, member of the Supreme Council (1990–1992).
- Simona-Maya Teodoroiu, 55, Romanian judge and politician, judge of the constitutional court (2015–2019), deputy (since 2020).
- Luis Tiant, 83, Cuban baseball player (Boston Red Sox, Cleveland Indians, New York Yankees).
- Bernard Tissier de Mallerais, 79, French traditionalist Catholic prelate, bishop of the Society of Saint Pius X (since 1988), injuries sustained in a fall.
- Edward Vaughn, 90, American politician, member of the Michigan House of Representatives (1979–1980, 1995–2000).
- Panangipalli Venugopal, 82, Indian cardiac surgeon.
- Wu Bangguo, 83, Chinese politician, vice premier (1995–2003) and chairman of the NPCSC (2003–2013).
- Artyom Yenin, 48, Russian footballer (Shinnik Yaroslavl, Spartak Kostroma, national team).

=== 9 ===
- George Baldock, 31, English-born Greek footballer (MK Dons, Sheffield United, Greece national team), drowned.
- Michel Boyibanda, 84, Congolese musician (TPOK Jazz).
- Dieter Burdenski, 73, German footballer (Werder Bremen, West Germany national team).
- Ana Cano Díaz, 58, Spanish politician, deputy (2008–2011).
- Francisco Javier Carrera Noriega, 59, Spanish politician, member of the Cortes of Castile and León (since 2022), cancer.
- Jerry Covington, 69, American custom motorcycle builder.
- Patrick Culbert, 76, American politician, member of the New Hampshire House of Representatives (1988–1990, 2012–2014).
- Lily Ebert, 100, Hungarian-born British Holocaust survivor and writer.
- Aurélien Ferenczi, 61, French journalist and film critic, heart attack.
- Fritz von Friedl, 83, German-born Austrian actor (Ideal Woman Sought, Karl May).
- Rasma Garne, 83, Latvian actress.
- John Stafford Geddes, 85, Northern Irish cardiologist and electrophysiologist.
- Arild Gulden, 82, Norwegian handball player and footballer (Lyn, Grasshoppers, national team).
- Willem Heath, 79, South African lawyer and jurist, head of the Special Investigating Unit (1996–2001, 2011).
- Steve Hodges, 75, American politician, member of the Missouri House of Representatives (2007–2014).
- Tiberiu Kallo, 81, Romanian footballer (Farul Constanța, Târgoviște, national team).
- Lee Wei Ling, 69, Singaporean neurologist, director of the National Neuroscience Institute, complications from progressive supranuclear palsy.
- T. P. Madhavan, 88, Indian actor (Chirikkudukka, Arangum Aniyarayum, Aavanikunnile Kinnaripookkal), stomach disease.
- Dhaneswar Majhi, 83, Indian politician, MP (1978–1984) and three-time Odisha MLA.
- Eddie Miró, 89, Puerto Rican television host.
- Elisa Montés, 89, Spanish actress (Django the Condemned, Samson and His Mighty Challenge, 99 Women).
- Hadriaan van Nes, 82, Dutch rower, Olympic silver medalist (1968).
- Ralph Okerlund, 72, American politician, member of the Utah State Senate (2009–2020).
- Augie Pabst, 90, American racing driver, USAC champion (1959).
- Bruno Pochesci, 54, Italian-born French musician and writer.
- Aleksandr Puchkov, 67, Russian hurdler, Olympic bronze medalist (1980).
- Clark R. Rasmussen, 90, American politician, member of the Iowa House of Representatives (1965–1967).
- Hakob Sanasaryan, 87, Armenian environmentalist and biochemist. (death announced on this date)
- Leif Segerstam, 80, Finnish conductor (Helsinki Philharmonic Orchestra, Royal Swedish Opera), composer of symphonies, and musician, pneumonia.
- Hiroshi Shirai, 87, Japanese karateka.
- Elahi Bux Soomro, 98, Pakistani politician, speaker of the National Assembly (1997–2001), cardiac arrest.
- Ratan Tata, 86, Indian conglomerate industry executive, chairman of Tata Sons and Tata Group (1990–2012, 2016–2017).
- Lyudmila Trut, 90, Russian ethologist (domesticated silver fox).
- Pierre Vernier, 93, French actor (Mama, There's a Man in Your Bed, Le Solitaire, Qu'est-ce qu'on attend pour être heureux!).

=== 10 ===
- Adam Abeshouse, 63, American recording engineer, music producer, and classical violinist, Grammy winner (2000), bile duct cancer.
- Fleur Adcock, 90, New Zealand poet.
- Kevin Bowring, 70, Welsh rugby union player (London Welsh) and coach (national team), heart attack.
- Alexander Bradshaw, 80, British physicist.
- Regis Brodie, 81, American art historian.
- Peter Cormack, 78, Scottish football player (Liverpool, national team) and manager (Partick Thistle), complications from dementia.
- Gunnar Eggen, 78, Norwegian harness racer.
- W. B. Ekanayake, 76, Sri Lankan politician, MP (2000–2015), fall.
- Alison Field, 58, American epidemiologist.
- Joyce Hens Green, 95, American jurist, judge of the U.S. District Court for the District of Columbia (since 1979).
- Tony Guzzo, 75, American college baseball coach (North Carolina Wesleyan University, VCU Rams, Old Dominion Monarchs).
- Thomas Hattery, 70, American politician, member of the Maryland House of Delegates (1983–1995), cancer.
- Dona Irwin, 92, American politician, member of the New Mexico House of Representatives (1999–2017).
- J. J. Jeffrey, 84, American radio executive (Atlantic Coast Radio) and disc jockey (WFIL, WLS), cancer.
- Ethel Kennedy, 96, American human rights advocate, founder of Robert F. Kennedy Human Rights, complications from a stroke.
- Judith de Kom, 93, Dutch-Surinamese activist and novelist.
- Brian Lockwood, 78, English rugby league footballer (Castleford, Hull Kingston Rovers, national team).
- Giacomo Maccheroni, 88, Italian politician, president of the Regional Council of Tuscany (1983–1987), deputy (1987–1994).
- Koushal Kishor Mishra, 67, Indian political scientist, lung infection.
- Leszek Moczulski, 94, Polish political dissident, MP (1991–1997).
- Sir Frank Moore, 93, Australian tourism advocate.
- Teresa Nowak, 82, Polish Olympic hurdler (1972), complications from dementia.
- David Page, 80, British journalist.
- Gaylen Pitts, 78, American baseball player (Oakland Athletics).
- Louis Scolnik, 101, American civil rights attorney and jurist, associate justice of the Maine Supreme Judicial Court (1983–1988).
- Murasoli Selvam, 84, Indian newspaper editor (Murasoli), heart attack.
- Doug Sides, 82, American jazz drummer and composer.
- El Taiger, 37, Cuban reggaeton singer, shot.
- James T. Vaughn Jr., 75, American lawyer and judge, associate justice of the Delaware Supreme Court (2014–2023).
- Véronique Zuber, 88, French model and actress (Dishonorable Discharge, The Gendarme of Champignol).

=== 11 ===
- Thomas Ammer, 87, German historian.
- Thomas Astan, 82, German Roman Catholic priest and actor (Der Kommissar, The Old Fox, Derrick).
- John Barstow, 87, English pianist and teacher.
- Jiří Bartolšic, 71, Czech bicycle racer.
- Roger Browne, 94, American actor (Venus Against the Son of Hercules, Super Seven Calling Cairo, The Spy Who Loved Flowers).
- Mike Bullard, 67, Canadian stand-up comedian and talk show host (Open Mike with Mike Bullard, The Mike Bullard Show), heart attack.
- Ward Christensen, 78, American computer scientist (XMODEM, CBBS), heart attack.
- Mick Crotty, 79, Irish hurler (James Stephens, Kilkenny).
- Ronnie Dawson, 92, Irish rugby union player (Barbarian, national team, British & Irish Lions).
- Dennis C. Donaldson, 86, American politician, member of the Maryland House of Delegates (1979–1991).
- Joe Gibson, 86, American politician, member of the Texas House of Representatives (1979–1981).
- Jamaluddin Hossain, 80, Bangladeshi actor.
- Vicente Juan Segura, 69, Spanish Roman Catholic prelate, bishop of Ibiza (2005–2020) and auxiliary bishop of Valencia (2020–2023).
- Abid Kashmiri, 74, Pakistani actor (Bazar-e-Husn, Samundar, Teesra Kinara) and comedian.
- George Little, 82, American politician.
- Kiril Marichkov, 79, Bulgarian rock musician (Shturcite).
- Chip Mellor, 73, American lawyer, co-founder of the Institute for Justice, leukemia.
- Tony Messner, 85, Australian politician, senator (1975–1990) and minister for veterans' affairs (1980–1983).
- Dottie Leonard Miller, 79, American music publishing and record label executive.
- Mario Morra, 89, Italian film editor (The Battle of Algiers, Burn!, Cinema Paradiso).
- Aminollah Rashidi, 99, Iranian composer.
- Branko Rašović, 82, Montenegrin footballer (Partizan, Borussia Dortmund, Yugoslavia national team).
- Baltazar Ushca, 80, Ecuadorian ice harvester, last iceman of Chimborazo.
- Alix Verrier, 93, Haitian Roman Catholic prelate, coadjutor bishop (1985–1988) and bishop (1988–2009) of Les Cayes.
- Ya Hsien, 92, Taiwanese poet and scholar.
- Oubkiri Marc Yao, 81, Burkinabé politician and diplomat, vice-president of the National Assembly (2007).

=== 12 ===
- Keith Campbell, 85–86, Australian philosopher.
- Tylee Craft, 23, American college football player (North Carolina Tar Heels), lung cancer.
- Donald R. Davis, 90, American entomologist.
- Mati Erelt, 83, Estonian linguist.
- Walter Harris, 83, American chess player.
- Ted Honderich, 91, Canadian-born British philosopher.
- Jackmaster, 38, Scottish DJ, complications from a head injury.
- Ka, 52, American rapper and record producer.
- Gilopez Kabayao, 94, Filipino violinist.
- Mary Kasten, 96, American politician.
- Helga Konrad, 76, Austrian politician, MP (1990–1999).
- Benny Laos, 52, Indonesian politician and businessman, regent of Morotai Island (2017–2022), fire.
- Lilly Ledbetter, 86, American equal-pay activist (Lilly Ledbetter Fair Pay Act of 2009), respiratory failure.
- Paul Lowe, 60, British war photographer, stabbed.
- Tito Mboweni, 65, South African politician, minister of labour (1994–1999) and finance (2018–2021).
- Margarete Müller, 93, German politician, member of the State Council of East Germany (1963–1989).
- Edward Ozorowski, 83, Polish Roman Catholic prelate, auxiliary bishop (1991–2006) and archbishop (2006–2017) of Białystok.
- Carlos Payan, 60–61, French Protestant pastor, heart attack.
- Jean-François Picheral, 90, French politician, mayor of Aix-en-Provence (1989–2001) and senator (1998–2008).
- Rainer Prachtl, 74, German politician, member of the Landtag of Mecklenburg-Vorpommern (1990–2006).
- Hans Pretterebner, 80, Austrian journalist and politician, MP (1994–1995).
- Alvin Rakoff, 97, Canadian film and television director (Paradise Postponed, A Voyage Round My Father, Death Ship).
- Thomas A. Regelski, 83, American music educator and philosopher.
- G. N. Saibaba, 57, Indian academic and human rights activist.
- Alex Salmond, 69, Scottish politician, first minister (2007–2014), heart attack.
- Ghulam Sarwar Sr., 70–71, Pakistani footballer (national team). (death announced on this date)
- Lillian Schwartz, 97, American visual artist.
- Baba Siddique, 66, Indian politician, Maharashtra MLA (1999–2014), shot.
- Dante Simbulan Sr., 94, Filipino military officer and activist.
- Mahendra Singh Sodha, 92, Indian physicist.
- Charles E. Sporck, 96, American engineer.
- Héctor Stefani, 64, Argentine politician, deputy (since 2017), skin cancer.
- Gary Stroutsos, 70, American flutist, multiple system atrophy.
- Ary Toledo, 87, Brazilian humorist, complications from pneumonia.
- Oldřich Vlasák, 68, Czech politician, member (2004–2014) and vice-president (2012–2014) of the European Parliament.

=== 13 ===
- Christian Fredrik Borchgrevink, 100, Norwegian physician.
- Shaban Al-Dalou, 19, Palestinian man, burned.
- Dominiq Fournal, 68, Belgian plastic artist, painter and photographer.
- Peter Fregene, 77, Nigerian Olympic footballer (1968).
- Mayra Gómez Kemp, 76, Cuban-Spanish television presenter (Un, dos, tres... responda otra vez, La ruleta de la fortuna), complications from a fall.
- Donald J. Hall Sr., 96, American greeting card executive, CEO of Hallmark Cards (1966–1986).
- Dame Elizabeth Hanan, 87, Australian-born New Zealand politician, science educator, and community leader, deputy mayor of Dunedin (1998–2004).
- Brunhilde Hanke, 94, German politician, member of the State Council (1967–1990) and the Volkskammer (1963–1990), mayor of Potsdam (1961–1984).
- Alain Huetz de Lemps, 98, French geographer and botanist.
- Ray Jefferson, 58, American government official, assistant secretary of labor for veterans' employment and training (2009–2011).
- Bernard Lagneau, 87, French plastic artist.
- Lê Văn Triết, 94, Vietnamese diplomat and politician, minister of trade (1991–1997).
- Jim Liddle, 66, Scottish footballer (Forfar Athletic, Cowdenbeath, Hamilton Academical).
- Marjorie, 58, Finnish singer.
- Yoshio Matsui, 87, Japanese politician, speaker of the Osaka Prefectural Assembly (1996–1997).
- Ed Millard, 77, Canadian Olympic wrestler.
- Donal Murray, 84, Irish Roman Catholic prelate, auxiliary bishop of Dublin (1982–1996) and bishop of Limerick (1996–2009).
- Vyacheslav Nikiforov, 58, Russian footballer (Baltika Kaliningrad, Dinamo Minsk, Akademiya Tolyatti).
- Thomas Perkins, 93, American politician, member of the Maine House of Representatives (1975–1979) and Senate (1979–1991).
- Gyan Prakash Pilania, 92, Indian politician, MP (2003–2014).
- Janne Puhakka, 29, Finnish ice hockey player (Kiekko-Espoo, Espoo United, Rapaces de Gap), shot.
- Terry Ruane, 77, English theatre director, cancer.
- Len Silver, 92, English motorcycle speedway rider and promoter.
- Alexander Smolensky, 70, Russian banker.
- Libby Titus, 77, American singer-songwriter.
- Kenzhebek Ukin, 84, Kazakh politician, deputy (1985–1993), head of the Kostanay Region (1992–1993). (death announced on this date)
- Ken Wolf, 86, American politician, member of the Minnesota House of Representatives (1993–2002).

=== 14 ===
- William H. Beaver, 84, American accounting researcher.
- Rafik Ben Salah, 76, Tunisian-Swiss writer.
- Richard Conroy, 91, Irish politician, senator (1977–1981, 1989–1993).
- Thomas J. Donohue, 86, American business executive, president (1997–2019) and CEO (1997–2021) of the U.S. Chamber of Commerce, heart failure.
- John Fraser Hart, 100, American geographer.
- Arthur C. Hawkins, 88, American politician, member of the New Mexico House of Representatives (1995–1997, 1999–2001).
- Stefan Jakobielski, 87, Polish historian and archaeologist.
- Bjarne Jeppesen, 70, Danish Olympic handball player (1980).
- Ismail Kalebudde, 86, Indian politician, Karnataka MLC (1998–2004).
- Robert Maxwell, 79, New Zealand cricketer (Otago, Central Otago).
- Morris Mills, 97, American politician, member of the Indiana House of Representatives (1968–1972) and Senate (1972–2000).
- Keizō Murase, 89, Japanese suitmaker, stuntman and sculptor (Mothra, King Kong vs. Godzilla, The Mighty Peking Man), cirrhosis.
- Nadeem al-Wajidi, 70, Indian Islamic scholar. (death announced on this date)
- Rieko Nakagawa, 89, Japanese writer (Guri and Gura, Sora Iro no Tane) and lyricist.
- Dennis Neary, 80, American politician, member of the Indiana Senate (1976–1992).
- Dame Janet Nelson, 82, British historian.
- Jorge Otero Barreto, 87, Puerto Rican soldier.
- Barbara Owen, 91, American organist and scholar (Boston University).
- Atul Parchure, 57, Indian actor (The Kapil Sharma Show, Jaago Mohan Pyare, Bhago Mohan Pyare), liver cancer.
- Lorenzo Pepe, 93, Argentine trade unionist, political prisoner and politician, deputy (1983–2003).
- Domenico Rosati, 95, Italian trade unionist and politician.
- Štefan Seme, 77, Slovenian Olympic ice hockey player (1972). (death announced on this date)
- Samuel Balagadde Ssekkadde, 80s, Ugandan Anglican clergyman, bishop of Namirembe (1994–2009).
- Andrew Stahl, 69–70, British painter.
- Reba White Williams, 88, American author and philanthropist.
- Philip Zimbardo, 91, American psychologist (Stanford prison experiment, Heroic Imagination Project) and writer (The Lucifer Effect).

=== 15 ===
- Garbis Aprikian, 98, Egyptian-born French choral conductor and composer.
- Bud Daley, 92, American baseball player (Cleveland Indians, Kansas City Athletics, New York Yankees).
- E. Allen Emerson, 70, American computer scientist (CTL, CTL*).
- Sir Henry de Boulay Forde, 91, Barbadian politician, MP (1971–1999), minister of external affairs (1976–1981) and attorney-general (1976–1981).
- Robert Fulford, 92, Canadian journalist (Financial Times of Canada, National Post).
- Selma Gould, 88, American politician, member of the New Hampshire House of Representatives (1978–1982).
- Hiew King Cheu, 72, Malaysian politician, MP (2008–2013) and Sabah State MLA (2013–2018), lung cancer.
- Shabir Hussain, 56, British restaurateur, cancer.
- Ismet Iskandar, 76, Indonesian politician, regent of Tangerang (2003–2013).
- Sir Mike Jackson, 80, British general, chief of the general staff (2003–2006) and Commander-in-Chief, Land Forces (2000–2003), prostate cancer.
- Chiken Kakazu, 83, Japanese politician, MP (1996–2009), bile duct cancer.
- Joe Koff, 73, American professional wrestling executive (Ring of Honor), cancer.
- Witold Kruczek, 102, Polish physicist and academic.
- Belaïd Lacarne, 83, Algerian football referee.
- Peter Luther, 85, German equestrian, Olympic bronze medallist (1984).
- Arthur Maughan, 83, American wrestler and coach.
- Jean-Jacques N'Domba, 70, Congolese footballer (Le Puy, Lyon, national team).
- George Negus, 82, Australian journalist and television host (60 Minutes, Foreign Correspondent, 6.30 with George Negus), complications from Alzheimer's disease.
- Hajime Ogawa, 85, Japanese politician, MP (1986–1990, 1993–2000).
- Stan Persky, 83, Canadian writer and media commentator (Georgia Straight).
- Saimin Redjosentono, 83, Surinamese academic and politician.
- Richard Secord, 92, American air force major general.
- Bob Seeley, 96, American boogie-woogie pianist.
- Antonio Skármeta, 83, Chilean writer (Ardiente paciencia).
- Henryk Suchora, 73, Polish politician, MP (1991–1993).
- Frank Talbot, 94, South African-born Australian ichthyologist and marine biologist.
- Peter Vassella, 83, Australian Olympic sprinter.
- Alexandre Voisard, 94, Swiss writer and politician, member of the Parliament of Jura (1979–1983).

=== 16 ===
- Béatrice de Andia, 91, Spanish-French writer and curator.
- Paul McDonald Calvo, 90, Guamanian politician, governor (1979–1983) and senator (1971–1975).
- Nick Carbó, 60, Filipino-American poet and writer.
- Matia Chowdhury, 82, Bangladeshi politician, minister of agriculture (2009–2019) and MP (1991–2001, 2009–2024).
- Sherry Coben, 71, American television writer and producer (Kate & Allie, Ryan's Hope, Bailey Kipper's P.O.V.), cancer.
- Sukh Dev, 101, Indian organic chemist, academic and researcher.
- Agustí Forné López, 62, Spanish journalist (Televisió de Catalunya), stroke.
- Claire Gaudiani, 79, American academic administrator, leukemia.
- Evelyn Hurley, 109, American nun and educator.
- Les Jarry, 96, Australian rules footballer (South Melbourne).
- Patricia Johanson, 84, American artist and environmentalist, heart failure.
- Tina Kaidanow, 59, American diplomat and government official, ambassador to Kosovo (2008–2009) and coordinator for counterterrorism (2014–2016), cardiac arrest.
- Oleksandr Kikhtenko, 68, Ukrainian military leader and politician, governor of Donetsk Oblast (2014–2015).
- Enrique Larre, 91, Chilean politician, senator (1990–1998) and mayor of La Unión (1963–1973, 1963–1988).
- Richard Latterell, 96, American environmental activist.
- Lee Lai-fa, 68, Taiwanese baseball player, Olympic silver medalist (1992), liver cancer.
- Inger Lorre, 61, American musician (Nymphs) and songwriter ("Yard of Blonde Girls"), cervical cancer.
- Danny Mandia, 70, Filipino dubbing director.
- Patti McGee, 79, American Hall of Fame skateboarder, complications from a stroke.
- Javed Nasir, 87, Pakistani military officer, director-general of the Inter-Services Intelligence (1992–1993).
- Casimir Nowotarski, 91, French footballer (Bordeaux, Lille) and manager (Gueugnon).
- Ollie Olsen, 66, Australian musician (No, Max Q) and composer (Dogs in Space).
- Liam Payne, 31, English singer (One Direction), fall.
- Bati Penia, Sri Lankan-Fijian rugby sevens player (Sri Lanka national team).
- Roald Poulsen, 73, Danish football manager (Odense Boldklub, Zambia national team).
- Raymond A. Price, 91, Canadian geologist.
- Andrew D. Roberts, 87, British historian.
- Masao Sakon, 87, Japanese politician, MP (1983–1996).
- Christian Martin Schmidt, 81, German musicologist.
- Yahya Sinwar, 61, Palestinian politician, Hamas chief in the Gaza Strip (since 2017) and chairman of the Hamas political bureau (since 2024), shot.
- Ron Smith, 77, American bridge player.
- Roy Thomason, 79, British politician, MP (1992–1997).
- Whit Tucker, 83, Canadian football player (Ottawa Rough Riders).
- Joe Viola, 86, American film director (The Hot Box, Angels Hard as They Come), screenwriter (Black Mama White Mama), and producer.
- Roy Walsh, 75, Northern Irish Provisional IRA volunteer and convicted criminal (1973 Old Bailey bombing).
- Zheng Mengxiong, 91, Chinese politician and journalist.

=== 17 ===
- George A. Bekey, 96, Czechoslovak-born American roboticist.
- Manuel Octavio Bermúdez, 63, Colombian rapist and serial killer, shot.
- Jim Campbell, 87, American baseball player (Houston Colt .45s).
- Virginia Carter, 87, Canadian physicist and entertainment executive.
- Emile Daems, 86, Belgian racing cyclist.
- Nicholas Daniloff, 89, American journalist (U.S. News & World Report).
- Isabelle de Borchgrave, 78, Belgian sculptor and painter, cancer.
- Simon Fieschi, 41, French webmaster and writer, survivor of the Charlie Hebdo shooting.
- Brigitte Fink, 84, Italian luger.
- Yves Frégnac, 73, French neuroscientist.
- Tom Garvin, 79–80, Irish political scientist and historian.
- Mitzi Gaynor, 93, American actress (There's No Business Like Show Business, The Birds and the Bees, South Pacific), singer and dancer.
- Bobby Gill, 65, American racing driver (NASCAR), brain cancer.
- Alicia Henry, 58, American contemporary artist.
- Aaron Kaufman, 51, American film director (Superpower) and producer (Machete Kills, Sin City: A Dame to Kill For), heart attack.
- Sultan Kigab, 69, Sudanese marathon swimmer.
- François Kouyami, 82, Beninese general and politician.
- Imre Kozma, 84, Hungarian Roman Catholic priest and human rights activist.
- Mir Humayun Khan Marri, Pakistani politician, deputy chairman of the senate (1997–1999) and caretaker chief minister of Balochistan (1990).
- Betty Jo Nelsen, 89, American politician, member of the Wisconsin State Assembly (1979–1990), administrator of the Food and Nutrition Service (1990–1992).
- Toshiyuki Nishida, 76, Japanese actor (The Silk Road, Tsuribaka Nisshi 6, Monkey).
- Dale F. Nitzschke, 87, American academic, president of Marshall University (1984–1990), UNH (1990–1994) and SEMO (1996–1999).
- Beatrice Nkatha, 66, Kenyan politician, member of the National Assembly (2013–2022).
- Rick Nolan, 80, American businessman and politician, member of the U.S. House of Representatives (1975–1981, 2013–2019) and Minnesota House of Representatives (1969–1973), heart disease.
- Vasso Papandreou, 79, Greek politician and economist, European commissioner for jobs and social rights (1989–1992) and MP (1993–2012).
- Kamlesh Patel, Indian politician, Gujarat MLA (1990–2002).
- Árpád Potápi, 57, Hungarian politician, MP (since 1998), heart attack.
- Debraj Roy, 69, Indian actor (Pratidwandi, Calcutta 71, Marjina Abdulla), multiple organ failure.
- Prabhat Kumar Samantaray, 74, Indian politician, MP (1998–2004).
- Andrew Schally, 97, Polish-born American endocrinologist, Nobel laureate (1977).
- Joseph Schanda, 94, American politician, member of the New Hampshire House of Representatives (1990–1994).
- Marie-Christine Schrijen, 82–83, Belgian-born French photographer.
- Jeanne Socquet, 95, French painter and mosaicist.
- Willis H. Stephens, 99, American politician, member of the New York State Assembly (1953–1982).
- Shūji Takashina, 92, Japanese art historian, curator of the National Museum of Western Art (1959–1971).

=== 18 ===
- Heinz Aldinger, 91, German football referee.
- Chris Barbosa, 62, American music producer.
- Bruno Bartoloni, 84, Italian journalist (Agence France-Presse) and writer.
- Yehuda Bauer, 98, Czechoslovak-born Israeli Holocaust historian.
- Carole M. Brown, 82, American politician, member of the New Hampshire House of Representatives (2006–2010).
- François Colling, 84, Luxembourgish politician, deputy (1979–1999).
- Paul Demeny, 91, Hungarian demographer and economist.
- Ginés González García, 79, Argentine physician, diplomat and politician, minister of health (2002–2007, 2019–2021) and ambassador to Chile (2007–2015), cancer.
- Lyndon Harrison, Baron Harrison, 77, British politician, MEP (1989–1999), member of the House of Lords (1999–2022).
- Emin Fuat Keyman, 65, Turkish academic and political scientist.
- Mahasen al-Khateeb, 30–31, Palestinian artist, airstrike.
- Jürgen Knauss, 86, German businessman, marketer, and photographer.
- Sheldon J. Krys, 90, American diplomat, ambassador to Trinidad and Tobago (1985–1988).
- Moe Lemay, 62, Canadian ice hockey player (Vancouver Canucks, Edmonton Oilers, Boston Bruins).
- Paulo Sérgio Machado, 79, Brazilian Roman Catholic prelate, bishop of Ituiutaba (1989–2006) and São Carlos (2006–2015).
- Giulia Manfrini, 36, Italian surfer and snowboarder, impaled by swordfish.
- Myra McFadyen, 68, Scottish actress (Mamma Mia!, Emma, Made of Honor).
- Shepherd Mdladlana, 72, South African politician, minister of labour (1998–2010).
- Zebedeo John Opore, 77, Kenyan politician, MP (1997–2007).
- Johnathan Parkes, 35, New Zealand jockey.
- Maksym Petrenko, 46, Ukrainian climber, mortar strike. (death announced on this date)
- Donald B. Redford, 90, Canadian Egyptologist and archaeologist.
- Michel Roquejeoffre, 90, French army general.
- Joseph Rykwert, 98, Polish-born British architectural historian.
- Herman Selleslags, 86, Belgian photographer, euthanasia.
- Ellie G. Shuler Jr., 87, American lieutenant general.
- Shujeo Shyam, 78, Bangladeshi music director (Hason Raja, Joyjatra).
- Warren M. Washington, 88, American atmospheric scientist.
- Bobby Wilkins, 68, American racing driver.

=== 19 ===
- Amun Abdullahi, 49, Somali-born Swedish journalist (SR International), shot.
- Ronald Akers, 85, American professor and criminologist.
- José Aveiro, 88, Paraguayan footballer (Valencia, Ontinyent, national team).
- Norma Beecroft, 90, Canadian composer and producer.
- John Curry, 86, British tennis administrator.
- Fazlur Rahman Faruque, 80, Bangladeshi politician, MP (1973–1975).
- Joe Gaston, 93, Northern Irish rugby union player (Dublin University, Ulster Rugby, national team).
- Tommy Head, 79, American politician, member of the Tennessee House of Representatives (1986–2004).
- John Kinsel, 107, American World War II veteran (Navajo Code Talkers).
- Michel Klein, 103, French veterinarian.
- Barry Lyons, 79, Australian politician, mayor of City of Greater Bendigo (2013–2014).
- Rudy May, 80, American baseball player (Montreal Expos, New York Yankees, California Angels), complications from diabetes.
- Thelma Mothershed-Wair, 83, American counselor, member of the Little Rock Nine, complications from multiple sclerosis.
- Yakiv Pavlenko, 70, Ukrainian astronomer and astrophysicist.
- Iris Plotzitzka, 58, German Olympic shot putter (1988).
- Harry Quick, 83, Australian politician, MP (1993–2007).
- Lonnie Randolph Jr., 74, American civil rights activist.
- Brunilde Ridgway, 94, Italian-born American archaeologist and academic.
- Mel Showers, 78, American news anchor (WKRG-TV).
- Balachandran Vadakkedath, 69, Indian cultural activist, writer, and literary critic.
- Vadiveloo Govindasamy, 92, Malaysian politician, president of the Dewan Negara (1992–1995).
- David Vallat, 53, French jihadist. (body discovered on this date)
- Sim Van der Ryn, 89, Dutch-born American architect, complications from Alzheimer's disease.
- Yang Zhenhuai, 96, Chinese politician, minister of water resources (1988–1993).

=== 20 ===
- Ami Aaröe, 99, Swedish actress (Le Silence de la mer).
- Georges Aillères, 89, French rugby league player (Toulouse Olympique, national team).
- Fahmi Badayuni, 72, Indian poet.
- Arturo Bastes, 80, Filipino Roman Catholic prelate, bishop of Romblon (1997–2002) and Sorsogon (2003–2019).
- Solange Chalvin, 92, Canadian journalist.
- Chuck Coleman, 61, American aviator and aerospace engineer, plane crash.
- Pete Conacher, 92, Canadian ice hockey player (Toronto Maple Leafs, Chicago Blackhawks, New York Rangers).
- Lawreen Connors, 70, American biochemist, breast cancer.
- Eugenio Dal Corso, 85, Italian Roman Catholic cardinal (since 2019), bishop of Saurímo (1997–2008) and Benguela (2008–2018).
- Barbara Dane, 97, American musician and activist, co-founder of Paredon Records, assisted suicide.
- Ehsan Daxa, 41, Israeli army colonel, IED attack.
- Adamo Dionisi, 59, Italian actor (Dogman, Suburra, Enea).
- Dong Zhiming, 87, Chinese paleontologist.
- Hualing Nieh Engle, 99, Chinese-born American author and academic.
- Fethullah Gülen, 83, Turkish Muslim scholar and preacher, leader of the Gülen movement, heart and kidney failure.
- Paul White, Baron Hanningfield, 84, British politician and life peer, member of the House of Lords (since 1998).
- Ashti Hawrami, 76, Iraqi Kurdistani politician.
- Andy Ireland, 94, American politician, member of the U.S. House of Representatives (1977–1993).
- Walter Jacob, 94, American rabbi, chairman of CCAR (1992–1994) and co-founder of Abraham Geiger College.
- Willi A. Kalender, 75, German medical physicist and academic.
- Jindra Kramperová, 84, Czech Olympic figure skater (1956) and pianist.
- Ernest Mario, 86, American pharmaceutical executive, pancreatic cancer.
- Steve Mariotti, 71, American educator, activist, and businessman, heart attack.
- Alan Miller, 87, American football player (Boston Patriots, Oakland Raiders).
- Michael Newman, 67, American lifeguard and actor (Baywatch), heart failure.
- Peter L. Nissen, 100, Norwegian aviator and businessman, CEO of Widerøe (1981–1988).
- Humphrey Nwosu, 83, Nigerian civil servant.
- Janusz Olejniczak, 72, Polish pianist and actor (The Pianist), heart attack.
- Philip Ringwood, 71, English cricketer (Norfolk).
- Malene Sølvsten, 47, Danish author.
- Robert Twycross, 83, British physician and writer.
- Éric Yung, 76, French police inspector and journalist.

=== 21 ===
- Bantwal Jayaram Acharya, 67, Indian classical dancer and actor.
- Flory Anstadt, 95, Dutch programme creator (Kinderen voor Kinderen) and television director.
- Christine Boisson, 68, French actress (Emmanuelle, Identification of a Woman, Born for Hell), lung disease.
- Sbuyiselwe Angela Buthelezi, 55, South African politician and Zulu princess, MP (since 2021).
- Yigal Calek, 80, Israeli-born British Orthodox Jewish conductor and composer.
- John Campbell, 86, American football player (Minnesota Vikings, Pittsburgh Steelers, Baltimore Colts).
- A. Jay Cristol, 95, American judge.
- Egidio Cuadrado, 71, Colombian vallenato accordionist.
- Paul Di'Anno, 66, English singer (Iron Maiden) and songwriter ("Running Free"), cardiac tamponade.
- Karel Dobbelaere, 91, Belgian sociologist.
- Jennifer Kewley Draskau, Manx historian and linguist.
- Massimiliano Frezzato, 57, Italian comic book artist.
- Samuel Rhea Gammon III, 100, American diplomat, ambassador to Mauritius (1978–1980).
- Marie Goodman Hunter, 95, American actress and singer.
- Mimi Hines, 91, Canadian actress (Funny Girl) and singer.
- Barbara Kolb, 85, American composer.
- Paul V. Marshall, 77, American author and Episcopal prelate, bishop of Bethlehem (1996–2013).
- Peter Marzinkowski, 85, German Roman Catholic prelate, bishop of Alindao (2004–2014).
- Anna Maslova, 89, Russian politician, deputy (1979–1989). (death announced on this date)
- Odair Moniz, 43, Cape Verdean-born Portuguese immigrant, shot.
- Giovanni Battista Morandini, 87, Italian Roman Catholic prelate, apostolic nuncio to Syria (2004–2008).
- Dick Pope, 77, British cinematographer (Mr. Turner, The Illusionist, Motherless Brooklyn).
- Michael Reade, 58, Irish broadcaster (LMFM), cancer.
- Shirzat Bawudun, 58, Chinese Uyghur politician, head of the Xinjiang justice department (2016–2017). (death announced on this date)
- Paul Skinner, 79, British businessman, chairman of the Rio Tinto Group (2003–2009), cancer.
- Ron Stewart, 82, Canadian politician, Nova Scotia MLA (1993–1997), cancer.
- Abdullah Al-Taweel, 79–80, Kuwaiti politician, minister of health (2007–2008).
- Paul T. P. Wong, 87, Chinese-born Canadian clinical psychologist.

=== 22 ===
- David Andersen, 84, New Zealand cricketer (Auckland, Northern Districts).
- Asahikuni Masuo, 77, Japanese sumo wrestler.
- Bernd Bauchspieß, 85, German footballer (Berliner FC Dynamo, BSG Chemie Leipzig), Olympic bronze medallist (1964).
- Graham Blyth, 76, English audio engineer.
- Dmytro Bohachov, 32, Ukrainian footballer (FC Barsa Sumy, PFC Sumy, national U-20 team), killed in action.
- Charles Brandt, 82, American investigator, writer (I Heard You Paint Houses), and speaker.
- Richard A. Cash, 83, American global health researcher, public health physician, and internist, brain cancer.
- Terry Cole-Whittaker, 84, American New Thought author.
- Claire Daly, 66, American baritone saxophonist and composer, cancer.
- Annelie Ehrhardt, 74, German hurdler, Olympic champion (1972).
- Janice Fisher, 85, American politician, member of the Utah House of Representatives (2005–2014).
- Elizabeth Francis, 115, American supercentenarian, oldest person in the United States (since 2024).
- Susan Williams Gifford, 64, American politician, member of the Massachusetts House of Representatives (since 2003), cancer.
- Go Jin-hwa, 61, South Korean politician, MP (2004–2008).
- Edd Griles, 78, American music video director ("Girls Just Want to Have Fun", "Time After Time", "She Bop"), complications from Alzheimer's disease.
- Grizzly 399, 28, American grizzly bear, traffic collision.
- Gustavo Gutiérrez, 96, Peruvian Catholic priest and theologian, founder of Latin American liberation theology, pneumonia.
- Mike Haffner, 82, American football player (Denver Broncos, Cincinnati Bengals).
- Julia Hawkins, 108, American Masters athlete.
- Gilda Holst, 72, Ecuadorian writer and academic.
- Gerasim Khugayev, 77, South Ossetian politician, prime minister (1993–1994, 2001–2003).
- Roman Kowalewski, 75, Polish Olympic rower (1972).
- Ma Xinchun, 99, Chinese naval vice admiral.
- Jim McColl, 89, British television presenter (Beechgrove).
- Milka Mesić, 85, Croatian presidential consort.
- Jean-Claude Missiaen, 85, French film director and critic.
- Walter W. Müller, 91, German scholar.
- Lynda Obst, 74, American film and television producer (Interstellar, The Fisher King, The Hot Zone) and author, chronic obstructive pulmonary disease.
- Alan Sacks, 81, American television writer and producer (Chico and the Man, Welcome Back, Kotter), lymphoma.
- Ferenc Sánta Jr., 79, Hungarian violinist.
- Michael Suen, 80, Hong Kong government official, secretary for constitutional and mainland affairs (1997–2002), housing, planning and lands (2002–2007) and education (2007–2012).
- Tonhão, 55, Brazilian footballer (Palmeiras, Arsenal Tula, Nacional-SP).
- Johnnie Turner, 76, American politician, member of the Kentucky House of Representatives (1999–2003) and Senate (since 2021), complications from injuries sustained in fall.
- Fernando Valenzuela, 63, Mexican-American baseball player (Los Angeles Dodgers), owner (Tigres de Quintana Roo) and broadcaster, World Series champion (1981), septic shock and cirrhosis.
- Robert Willis, 77, English Anglican priest, dean of Hereford (1992–2000) and Canterbury (2001–2022).
- Richard Winfield, 91, American lawyer, complications from injuries sustained in a fall.

=== 23 ===
- Shamshad Abdullaev, 66, Uzbek poet, writer, and essayist.
- Haroon Ahmed, 88, Pakistani-British scientist.
- Hama Amadou, 74, Nigerien politician, prime minister (1995–1996, 2000–2007), malaria.
- Peter Arnold, 88, Australian politician, South Australia MHA (1968–1970, 1973–1993).
- Geoff Capes, 75, British Olympic shot putter (1972, 1976, 1980) and strongman.
- Antonio Cicero, 79, Brazilian poet, philosopher, and lyricist, Prêmio Jabuti laureate (2013), assisted suicide.
- Tim Clifford, 65, American football player (Indiana Hoosiers).
- Leon Cooper, 94, American physicist (Cooper pairs, BCM theory, BCS theory), Nobel Prize laureate (1972).
- Gustavo Adolfo Espina Salguero, 77, Guatemalan politician (1993 constitutional crisis), vice president (1991–1993).
- Nickie Hall, 65, American football player (Winnipeg Blue Bombers, Saskatchewan Roughriders, Green Bay Packers).
- Phyllis Baker Hammond, 94, American sculptor.
- Gary Indiana, 74, American novelist, playwright and art critic (The Village Voice), lung cancer.
- Jack Jones, 86, American singer ("Wives and Lovers", "Love Boat") and actor (Over the Garden Wall), leukemia.
- Linda LaFlamme, 85, American folk rock/psychedelic rock/jazz singer (It's a Beautiful Day), vascular dementia.
- Lee Sang-deuk, 88, South Korean politician and convicted briber, MP (1988–2012).
- Jack Mahoney, 93, Scottish moral theologian and academic.
- Nancy McDaniel, 57, American golf instructor.
- Donald McInnes, 85, American violist.
- Vladimir Mikushevich, 88, Russian poet, translator and philosopher.
- Robert C. Morgan, 81, American art critic and historian, amyloidosis.
- Coen Niesten, 86, Dutch racing cyclist.
- Marian Pieczka, 73, Polish Olympic gymnast (1976).
- Angela Roberts, 56, Canadian curler.
- Keiko Sena, 91, Japanese illustrator.
- Banwari Lal Sharma, 84, Indian politician, five-time Rajasthan MLA.
- Robert Sopuck, 73, Canadian politician, MP (2010–2019).
- Haralds Vasiļjevs, 72, Latvian ice hockey player (Dinamo Riga) and coach (EHC Dortmund, national team).
- James Wallwork, 94, American politician, member of the New Jersey Senate (1968–1982).
- Hugo Weckx, 89, Belgian politician, deputy (1977–1981, 1987–1995), senator (1981–1985).

=== 24 ===
- Amir Abdur-Rahim, 43, American basketball player (Southeastern Louisiana) and coach (Kennesaw State, South Florida), complications during surgery.
- Aliyu Ahman-Pategi, 59, Nigerian politician, MP (2015–2019).
- Jadwiga Barańska, 89, Polish actress (Countess Cosel) and screenwriter.
- Abdelaziz Barrada, 35, French-born Moroccan footballer (Getafe, Marseille, national team), heart attack.
- Joyce Blau, 92, Egyptian-born French linguist.
- Ed Bluestone, 75–76, American comedian and actor, complications from a stroke.
- John F. Burnett, 90, American film editor (Grease, The Way We Were, The Goodbye Girl).
- Sabahattin Çakmakoğlu, 93, Turkish politician, minister of defense (1999–2002) and the interior (1991), twice deputy.
- DJ Clark Kent, 58, Panamanian-American DJ, hip hop record producer and music executive, colon cancer.
- Duncan de Kergommeaux, 97, Canadian artist.
- Denys Graham, 98, Welsh actor (The Dam Busters, Dunkirk, Zulu).
- Dick Grimmond, 86, Australian footballer (Richmond).
- Tom Jarriel, 89, American journalist (20/20, ABC World News Tonight), complications from a stroke.
- John R. Klauder, 92, American physicist and mathematician.
- Nancy H. Kleinbaum, 76, American writer and journalist.
- Michel Lafranceschina, 85, French footballer (Lens, Lille) and manager (Grenoble).
- Tony Lanigan, 76, New Zealand civil engineer, chancellor of Auckland University of Technology (2000–2001).
- Joseph Magiera, 85, French footballer (FC Nancy, Valenciennes, Nancy).
- Marco Paulo, 79, Portuguese singer and television presenter, cancer.
- Paul R. Mendes-Flohr, 83, American-Israeli Jewish scholar.
- Roy W. Menninger, 97, American psychiatrist, president of the Menninger Foundation (1967–1993).
- Sir Anthony Merifield, 90, British civil servant.
- Tomislav Milićević, 84, Serbian footballer (Red Star Belgrade, Napredak Kruševac, Maribor).
- Juliana Panizo Rodríguez, 77, Spanish academic (University of Valladolid).
- Gerd Peehs, 82, German footballer (SV Saar 05 Saarbrücken, Borussia Dortmund, Borussia Neunkirchen).
- Alphonse Poaty-Souchlaty, 83, Congolese politician, prime minister (1989–1990).
- Adílson Rodrigues, 66, Brazilian boxer.
- Hans Rotmo, 76, Norwegian singer-songwriter, cancer.
- Eckhart Schmidt, 85, German film director (Der Fan), producer, and writer.
- Jan Shrem, 94, American book distributor and publisher. (death announced on this date)
- Alan Simpson, 84, British Olympic runner (1964).
- Ian Stephenson, 68, Australian curator. (body discovered on this date)
- Jeri Taylor, 86, American television writer and producer (Star Trek: The Next Generation, Star Trek: Voyager, Quincy, M.E.).
- Dieter Timme, 68, German football player (Hertha BSC) and manager (FSV Velten, Hallescher FC).
- Ed Zipperer, 93, American politician, member of the Georgia State Senate (1967–1975).

=== 25 ===
- Wolfgang Abel, 65, German serial killer, complications from a fall.
- Thomas Anderson, 91, American politician, member of the New Mexico House of Representatives (2003–2015).
- Tipu Aziz, 67, Bangladeshi-born British neurosurgeon, cancer.
- Ruby Chappelle Boyd, 105, American librarian.
- Tommy Callaghan, 78, Scottish football player (Dunfermline Athletic, Celtic, Clydebank) and manager.
- Jo Ann Davidson, 97, American politician, member (1981–2000) and speaker (1995–2000) of the Ohio House of Representatives.
- Bradford English, 82, American actor (Halloween: The Curse of Michael Myers, The Fabulous Baker Boys, Wolf).
- Jean-Jacques Gabut, 90, French writer and journalist (Le Progrès).
- Brad Gates, 85, American law enforcement official, sheriff-coroner of Orange County, California (1975–1999).
- Rohini Godbole, 71, Indian particle physicist.
- David Harris, 75, American actor (The Warriors, NYPD Blue, Brubaker), cancer.
- Bill Hay, 88, Canadian Hall of Fame ice hockey player (Chicago Blackhawks) and executive (Calgary Flames).
- Jean-Pierre Hernandez, 89, French gangster (French Connection).
- Alan Heston, 90, American economist.
- Kim Soo-mi, 75, South Korean actress (Barefoot Ki-bong, Late Blossom, Mapado).
- Phil Lesh, 84, American Hall of Fame musician (Grateful Dead) and songwriter ("Box of Rain", "Truckin'").
- Don Lewin, 91, British businessman, founder of Clintons.
- Dominique Lyone, 70, Australian businessman.
- Pavel Materna, 94, Czech philosopher and logician.
- Jeff McDuffie, 62, American racing driver.
- Ron Perry, 92, American athlete, coach and athletics administrator.
- Đorđe Petronijević, 63, Serbian Olympic boxer (1988). (death announced on this date)
- Kanaka Raju, 83, Indian dancer.
- Jerry Sandel, 82, American politician, member of the New Mexico House of Representatives (1971–2000).
- Walter Schmidt, 87, German footballer (Eintracht Braunschweig, West Germany B).
- Diane Tuckman, 89, American artist.
- Wang Ching-feng, 91, Taiwanese magistrate, county magistrate of Hualien (1993–2001).
- Zé Carlos, 56, Brazilian footballer (São Paulo, Grêmio, national team).

=== 26 ===
- Howard Isaac Aronson, 88, American linguist.
- Walter Ballard, 91, American racing driver.
- William Beavers, 89, American politician, member of the Chicago City Council (1983–2006), Cook County commissioner (2006–2013).
- Roman Burtsev, 53, Russian serial killer and child sex offender, cancer. (death announced on this date)
- Stephanie Collie, 60, British costume designer (Lock, Stock and Two Smoking Barrels, Peaky Blinders, Argylle), cancer.
- Jim Donovan, 68, American sportscaster (Cleveland Browns Radio Network) and news anchor (WKYC), chronic lymphocytic leukemia.
- Henry Fields, 86, American basketball player (PUC, Stade Français, Olympique Antibes).
- Asrat Haile, 72, Ethiopian football manager (national team).
- Kozo Iizuka, 93, Japanese engineer and convicted manslaughterer.
- Hiromitsu Miura, 43, Japanese mixed martial arts fighter and boxer, acute leukaemia.
- Durk Pearson, 81, American research scientist.
- Frank Ruff, 75, American politician, member of the Virginia House of Delegates (1994–2000) and Senate (2000–2024), kidney cancer.
- Ron Selway, 78, Scottish footballer (Dundee).
- John Sørensen, 90, Danish Olympic sprint canoer.
- Ustad Tafu, 79, Pakistani tabla player.
- Tam Shek-wing, 89, Hong Kong Buddhist scholar and public affairs columnist.
- Holden Trent, 25, American soccer player (Philadelphia Union).

=== 27 ===
- Paul Bailey, 87, British novelist and critic.
- Marisa Bartoli, 81, Italian actress (La bambolona, The Designated Victim).
- Sharon Bell, 80, American politician and jurist, member of the Tennessee House of Representatives (1978–1982).
- Ernst Bøgh, 69, Danish speedway racer, suicide.
- Alec Brader, 82, English footballer (Grimsby Town) and educator, kidney disease.
- Yvonne Chapman, 84, Australian politician, Queensland MP (1983–1989).
- Andrew Corran, 87, English cricketer (Norfolk, Cambridge University, Nottinghamshire).
- Charles Fry, 84, English cricketer (Oxford University, Hampshire, Northamptonshire) and cricket administrator, Parkinson's disease.
- Claude Huriet, 94, French politician, senator (1983–2001).
- Vitaly Ivanov, 89, Russian naval officer, admiral, commander of the Baltic Fleet (1985–1991), head of the Kuznetsov Naval Academy (1991–1995).
- John F. Keenan, 94, American judge, judge of the U.S. District Court for Southern New York (since 1983).
- Hans Kemna, 84, Dutch casting director and actor.
- Lily Li, 74, Hong Kong actress (The Wandering Swordsman, Executioners from Shaolin, The Young Master), lung cancer.
- Hugh Mitchell, 89, Australian footballer (Essendon, Dandenong).
- Miquel Obiols, 79, Spanish writer.
- Jean-Pierre Paranteau, 80, French Olympic cyclist (1968).
- Justin L. Quackenbush, 95, American jurist, judge (since 1980) and chief judge (1989–1995) of the U.S. District Court for Eastern Washington.
- Edzard Reuter, 96, German automotive executive, CEO of Daimler-Benz (1987–1995).
- Fredmund Sandvik, 73, Norwegian farmer and politician, chairman of Tine (2006–2010).
- Ray Semproch, 93, American baseball player (Philadelphia Phillies).
- Ralph W. Torr, 93, American politician, member of the New Hampshire House of Representatives (1982–1998).
- Yaakov Turner, 89, Israeli air force pilot, police officer, and politician, mayor of Beersheba (1998–2008).
- Ragne Veensalu, 37, Estonian actress (The Idiot, Kättemaksukontor).
- Bennie Dee Warner, 89, Liberian politician, vice president (1977–1980).
- Ward Watt, 84, American evolutionary biologist.

=== 28 ===
- Leon Albin, 98, American politician, member of the Maryland House of Delegates (1987–1994).
- Bill Beach, 92, American rockabilly musician.
- Eva Brann, 95, American academic.
- Alonzo Butler, 44, American heavyweight boxer.
- Genevra R. Counihan, 98, American politician, member of the Massachusetts House of Representatives (1975–1978).
- Bill Day, 90, Australian Olympic skier (1952, 1956, 1960).
- Akua Donkor, 72, Ghanaian politician.
- Tonči Gabrić, 62, Croatian footballer (Rijeka, Hajduk Split, national team).
- Daira Galvis, 71, Colombian lawyer and politician, senator (2007–2022).
- Diane Griffin, 84, American biologist.
- Cesare Gussoni, 90, Italian football referee.
- Andy Haydon, 91, Canadian engineer and politician, regional chair of Ottawa–Carleton (1978–1991).
- John Hopper, 74, Australian genetic epidemiologist.
- Gareth Humphreys, 88, Welsh lawn bowler.
- John James, 87, British rower, Olympic silver medallist (1964).
- Gillian Joynson-Hicks, 81, British evangelical Anglican and activist.
- Franz Kamphaus, 92, German Roman Catholic prelate, bishop of Limburg (1982–2007).
- Ngeyi Kanyongolo, 55, Malawian lawyer and academic administrator, vice-chancellor of the Catholic University of Malawi.
- François Laruelle, 87, French philosopher (Paris Nanterre University).
- James Ledbetter, 60, American author, journalist, and editor, heart attack.
- John Little, 96, Canadian painter.
- Renato Martino, 91, Italian Roman Catholic cardinal, permanent observer of the Holy See to the UN (1986–2002) and cardinal protodeacon (since 2014).
- Valery Meshkov, 79, Russian figure skater.
- Manuel "Guajiro" Mirabal, 91, Cuban trumpeter (Buena Vista Social Club).
- Paul Morrissey, 86, American film director (Flesh, Trash, Flesh for Frankenstein), pneumonia.
- Jerrod Mustaf, 55, American basketball player (New York Knicks, Phoenix Suns).
- Suzanne Osten, 80, Swedish film director (The Mozart Brothers, Mamma, The Guardian Angel) and screenwriter, complications from heart surgery.
- Ulf Pilgaard, 83, Danish actor (Nightwatch, Cirkusrevyen, Nikolaj og Julie).
- K. S. Puttaswamy, 98, Indian jurist and petitioner, judge of the High Court of Karnataka (1977–1986).
- Steve J. Rosen, 82, American lobbyist, complications from Alzheimer's disease.
- Hafiz Alam Sairani, 64, Indian politician, West Bengal MLA (1994–2006), lung cancer.
- Jamshid Sharmahd, 69, German-Iranian journalist and political dissident, hanged.
- Al Simmons, 73, Canadian ice hockey player (Boston Bruins, California Golden Seals).
- Derek George Smyth, 97, British biochemist.
- Kazuo Umezu, 88, Japanese manga artist (The Drifting Classroom, Makoto-chan, My Name Is Shingo), stomach cancer.
- Lonnie Warwick, 82, American football player (Minnesota Vikings, Atlanta Falcons, San Antonio Wings).
- Gloria Wing, 93, American politician, member of the Vermont House of Representatives (1987–1990).
- Zhao Fulin, 92, Chinese politician, chairman of Guangxi People's Congress (1995–2002).

=== 29 ===
- Josiah Abavu, 38, Papua New Guinean rugby league footballer (PNG Prime Minister's XIII, national team).
- Jaromír E. Brabenec, 90, Czech graphic designer and sculptor. (death announced on this date)
- Nickey Browning, 73, American politician, member of the Mississippi Senate (1996–2020).
- Nadia Cattouse, 99, British actress (Angels, Johnny Jarvis, Within These Walls), singer and songwriter.
- Charles, 52, Gabonese-born Canadian western lowland gorilla, heart failure.
- Teri Garr, 79, American actress (Tootsie, Young Frankenstein, Close Encounters of the Third Kind), complications from multiple sclerosis.
- Rayda Jacobs, 77, South African writer.
- Matilde Lorenzi, 19, Italian skier, complications from a skiing collision.
- Dick Lowry, 89, American football coach (Wayne State Warriors, Hillsdale Chargers).
- Alan Lynch, 70, Australian footballer (Footscray, Richmond), complications from Parkinson's disease.
- Oleh Makarov, 59, Ukrainian politician, MP (since 2019).
- Alan Montefiore, 97, British philosopher, cardiac arrest.
- David Musuguri, 104, Tanzanian military officer, chief of the People's Defence Force (1980–1988).
- Steven Rudich, 63, American computational theorist.
- Phil Rickman, 74, British author (The Bones of Avalon).
- Bungo Shirai, 96, Japanese journalist and businessman.
- Jennifer Soldati, 77, American politician, member of the New Hampshire House of Representatives (1989–1994).
- Raymond Wardingley, 89, American politician.
- Muhammad Younis, 75, Pakistani Olympic runner.
- Hassan Youssef, 90, Egyptian actor (There is a Man in our House, Three Thieves).

=== 30 ===
- William P. Albrecht, 89, American economist, commissioner (1988–1993) and acting chairman (1993) of the Commodity Futures Trading Commission.
- Marisela Berti, 74, Venezuelan actress (Doña Bárbara, Dulce Ilusión, Carmen querida).
- P. J. Carroll, 80, Irish Gaelic football player (Cavan Gaels, Cavan) and manager.
- Giovanni Cianfriglia, 89, Italian actor (Superargo Versus Diabolicus, Kill Them All and Come Back Alone, Everything Happens to Me) and stuntman.
- Erik Clausen, 82, Danish actor (In the Middle of the Night), film director (The Dark Side of the Moon) and screenwriter (Temporary Release).
- Storm De Beul, 22, Belgian YouTuber and nature survivalist, hypothermia.
- Mustafa Fahmy, 82, Egyptian actor (Where Is My Mind?, Five-Star Thieves).
- André Freire, 63, Portuguese political scientist, complications from surgery.
- Christine Görner, 94, German actress (What a Woman Dreams of in Springtime, Mandolins and Moonlight) and opera singer (Gräfin Mariza).
- Jo Hea-jung, 71, South Korean volleyball player, Olympic bronze medallist (1976).
- Wally Kennedy, 76, American television and radio announcer (WPVI-TV).
- Tony Kehrer, 87, Canadian football player (Winnipeg Blue Bombers, Edmonton Eskimos).
- Don Lawrence, 87, American football player (Washington Redskins).
- Arthur Moreira Lima, 84, Brazilian classical pianist, colon cancer.
- Elisabeth Ohlson Wallin, 63, Swedish photographer and artist (Ecce Homo), stomach cancer.
- Matt Peacock, 72, Australian journalist (ABC News), pancreatic cancer.
- Sumie Sakai, 79, Japanese actress and voice actress (Devilman, Attack No. 1, Dororon Enma-kun).
- John Rose, 79, British anti-Zionist activist, renal failure.
- Pedro Sarmiento, 68, Colombian football player (Atlético Nacional, América de Cali, national team) and manager, polycythemia.
- Bob Tanner, 94, American politician, member of the Wyoming House of Representatives (1997–2001).
- Brian Tesler, 95, British television producer and executive.
- Peter Wall, 80, English footballer (Crystal Palace, Liverpool, Shrewsbury Town).
- Horst Weigelt, 90, German theologian. (death announced on this date)
- Karl-Josef Weißenfels, 72, German volleyball player, Paralympic champion (1988, 1992, 1996).
- Nishadh Yusuf, 43, Indian film editor (Thallumaala, Saudi Vellakka, Kanguva). (body discovered on this date)
- Tahar Zbiri, 95, Algerian military officer, chief of staff (1964–1967), participant of the 1965 coup d'état and leader of the 1967 coup attempt.

=== 31 ===
- Natasha Alexenko, 51, American-Canadian crime victim advocate, founder of Natasha's Justice Project, amyotrophic lateral sclerosis and multiple sclerosis.
- Domingo Barrera, 81, Spanish Olympic boxer (1964).
- Bhulai Bhai, c. 111, Indian politician, Uttar Pradesh MLA (1974–1980).
- David Davin-Power, 72, Irish journalist (RTÉ News).
- Candy Devine, 85, Australian radio broadcaster (Downtown Radio) and singer.
- James Hart, 77, British police officer, commissioner of the City of London Police (2002–2006).
- Greg Hildebrandt, 85, American illustrator and artist.
- Ondrej Húserka, 34, Slovak mountaineer, fall.
- Masud Ali Khan, 95, Bangladeshi actor (Dipu Number Two, Dui Duari, Molla Barir Bou).
- Sarah Leonard, 71, English soprano, brain tumour.
- Wiesław Łukaszewski, 84, Polish psychologist.
- T. P. G. Nambiar, 94, Indian entrepreneur, founder of BPL Group.
- Charles Olumo, 101, Nigerian actor.
- Ševko Omerbašić, 79, Croatian imam.
- Devender Singh Rana, 58–59, Indian politician, Jammu and Kashmir MLA (2014–2018, since 2024).
- Dave Romansky, 86, American Olympic racewalker (1968).
- Martin Rößler, 90, German church musician and theologian.
- Manju Sharma, 83, Indian biotechnologist.
- Baselios Thomas I, 95, Indian Syriac Orthodox prelate, head of the Jacobite Syrian Christian Church (since 2002).
- David Vere-Jones, 88, British-born New Zealand statistician and probabilist, Rutherford Medal recipient (1999), FRSNZ (since 1982).
- Trevor Whymark, 74, English footballer (Ipswich Town, Grimsby Town, national team).
