= Carole M. Brown =

American politician (1942–2024)

Member of the New Hampshire House of Representatives
- In office 2006–2010 Serving with Suzanne Beauchesne (2006–2008), Carol McGuire (2008–2010), Margaret Porter (2006–2010), and Charles B. Yeaton (2006–2010)
- Constituency: Merrimack 8th

Personal details
- Born: Carole M. Young; June 6, 1942 Washington, D.C., U.S.
- Died: October 18, 2024 (aged 82)
- Party: Democratic

Carole M. Brown (née Young, June 6, 1942 – October 18, 2024) was an American politician from Epsom, New Hampshire. She served as a Democratic member of the New Hampshire House of Representatives, representing the Merrimack 8th district, consisting of the towns of Allenstown, Epsom, and Pittsfield, from 2006 to 2010. She was an artist and volunteer firefighter captain, and died on October 18, 2024, at the age of 82.
