= Zheng Mengxiong =

Chinese official (1933–2024)

Zheng Mengxiong (June 1933 – October 16, 2024, Chinese: 郑梦熊) was a Chinese politician and journalist. He worked in the leadership of the Zhejiang Daily and People's Daily.

== Biography ==
Zheng was from Jiangshan, Zhejiang.

In January 1957, Zheng Mengxiong became a member of the Chinese Communist Party. From August 1957 to February 1961, he held the position of deputy director of the Publicity Department of the Jiande Committee of the Communist Youth League and served as an editorial board member for the Zhejiang Youth Newspaper. From February 1961 to February 1990, he occupied various roles at the Zhejiang Daily, including head of the rural group, director of the editorial office, member of the editorial committee, deputy editor-in-chief, and editor-in-chief.

From February 1990 to October 1996, Zheng Mengxiong held the positions of deputy director, deputy editor-in-chief, and secretary of the party committee of the People's Daily, as well as head of the National Newspaper Theory and Publicity Research Association (Chinese: 全国报纸理论宣传研究会).

Zheng held the positions of secretary of the Party Group, vice chairman, and secretary of the Secretariat of the All-China Journalists Association from October 1996 to March 2001, and then served as vice chairman of the ACJA from March to October 2001.

Zheng Mengxiong was a delegate to the 15th National Congress of the Chinese Communist Party and was a member of the 9th National Committee of the Chinese People's Political Consultative Conference (CPPCC).

Zheng died on October 16, 2024, in Hangzhou at the age of 91 due to illness.
