= John Elward =

Australian rules footballer (1935–2024)

Personal information
- Full name: John William Elward
- Born: 6 April 1935; Alexandra
- Died: 7 October 2024 (aged 89); Wangaratta
- Original team: Alexandra (Waranga N.E. FL)
- Height: 191 cm (6 ft 3 in)
- Weight: 82 kg (181 lb)
- Position: Ruck

Playing career^{1}
Years	Club	Games (Goals)
1958–60	Hawthorn	16 (7)
- ^{1} Playing statistics correct to the end of 1960.

John William Elward (6 April 1935 – 7 October 2024) was an Australian rules footballer who played with Hawthorn in the Victorian Football League (VFL).

Hawthorn managed to recruit Elward just before clearances closed for 1957. He came from the regional town of Alexandra. Alexandra played in the Waranga North East Football League at the time. Tall enough to be a ruckman, John Elward played 16 senior games over three seasons between 1958 and 1960. He never managed to secure a senior position because he was injury prone. He was ruckman for the club's reserve grade side that won back to back premierships in 1958 and 1959.

Elward broken his leg in the last game of the reserves season in 1960, he re-broke his leg after playing ten minutes in his first reserve grade game in 1961.

== Honours and achievements ==
- 1958 and 1959 2nd 18 premiership player

Individual

- Hawthorn life member
- 1958 2nd 18 Best & Fairest trophy
