= Ruby Chappelle Boyd =

American librarian (1919–2024)

- Born: March 18, 1919; Philadelphia, Pennsylvania, U.S.
- Died: October 25, 2024 (aged 105)
- Education: Atlanta University

Ruby Chappelle Boyd (March 18, 1919 – October 25, 2024) was the first African-American librarian in the city of Philadelphia, Pennsylvania. She also worked to preserve the history of the African Methodist Episcopal Church.

== Early life and work in libraries ==
Ruby Chappelle was born in Philadelphia on March 18, 1919. Her parents, Bersie and Pearl Chappelle, had moved to Philadelphia from South Carolina during the Great Migration. After growing up in Philadelphia, Boyd sought work as a librarian and applied to attend Drexel Institute, but was denied admittance due to her race.

Boyd was a graduate of Wilberforce University and attended Atlanta University Library School, earning her Bachelor in Library Science and Service degree in 1943. While she was attending school in Atlanta, Philadelphia elementary school principal John Henry Brodhead fought a battle against discrimination in the city's government, and in 1943 the Free Library of Philadelphia advertised to hire their first African American librarian. Upon Boyd's return to Philadelphia she applied for the position and was appointed the city's first black librarian. She later became the first black librarian in the School District of Philadelphia.

In 1966, as president of the School Librarians Association of Philadelphia, she led the organization of the School Library Student Assistants Conference.

== Work for the A.M.E. Church ==
Boyd's maternal grandfather was an A.M.E. Church preacher and her mother served as superintendent of the Sunday school at Mother Bethel, the birthplace of the African Methodist Episcopal Church; Boyd was a lifelong member of that church. After her retirement from the Philadelphia school district, she dedicated her work to preserving the history of Mother Bethel, developing the Church's museum.

In 1982, Boyd edited a book about the Mother Bethel Church titled On this rock : the mother of African Methodism.

== Personal life and death ==
Chappelle married James T. Boyd, a school principal, and had one daughter. Chappelle Boyd still lived in Philadelphia as of 2018. She turned 100 in March 2019, and was honoured by the Zeta Phi Beta Sorority in August 2024. Boyd died on October 25, 2024, at the age of 105.
