= Tolen Toktasynov =

Kazakh politician (1962–2024)

Tölen Toqtasynov
- Төлен Тоқтасынов

Member of the Mäjilis
- In office September 2000 – October 2004

Personal details
- Born: 9 October 1962 Semipalatinsk, Semipalatinsk Oblast, Kazakh SSR, Soviet Union
- Died: 6 October 2024 (aged 61)
- Party: KPK; Democratic Choice of Kazakhstan
- Education: Alma-Ata Institute of Architecture and Civil Engineering
- Occupation: Engineer

Tölen Mūhamediūly Toqtasynov (Kazakh: Төлен Мұхамедиұлы Тоқтасынов; 9 October 1962 – 6 October 2024) was a Kazakh engineer and politician. A member of the Communist Party of Kazakhstan and the Democratic Choice of Kazakhstan, he served in the Mäjilis from 2000 to 2004.

Toqtasynov died on 6 October 2024, at the age of 61.
