= Tam Shek-wing =

Buddhist scholar (1935–2024)

- 談錫永
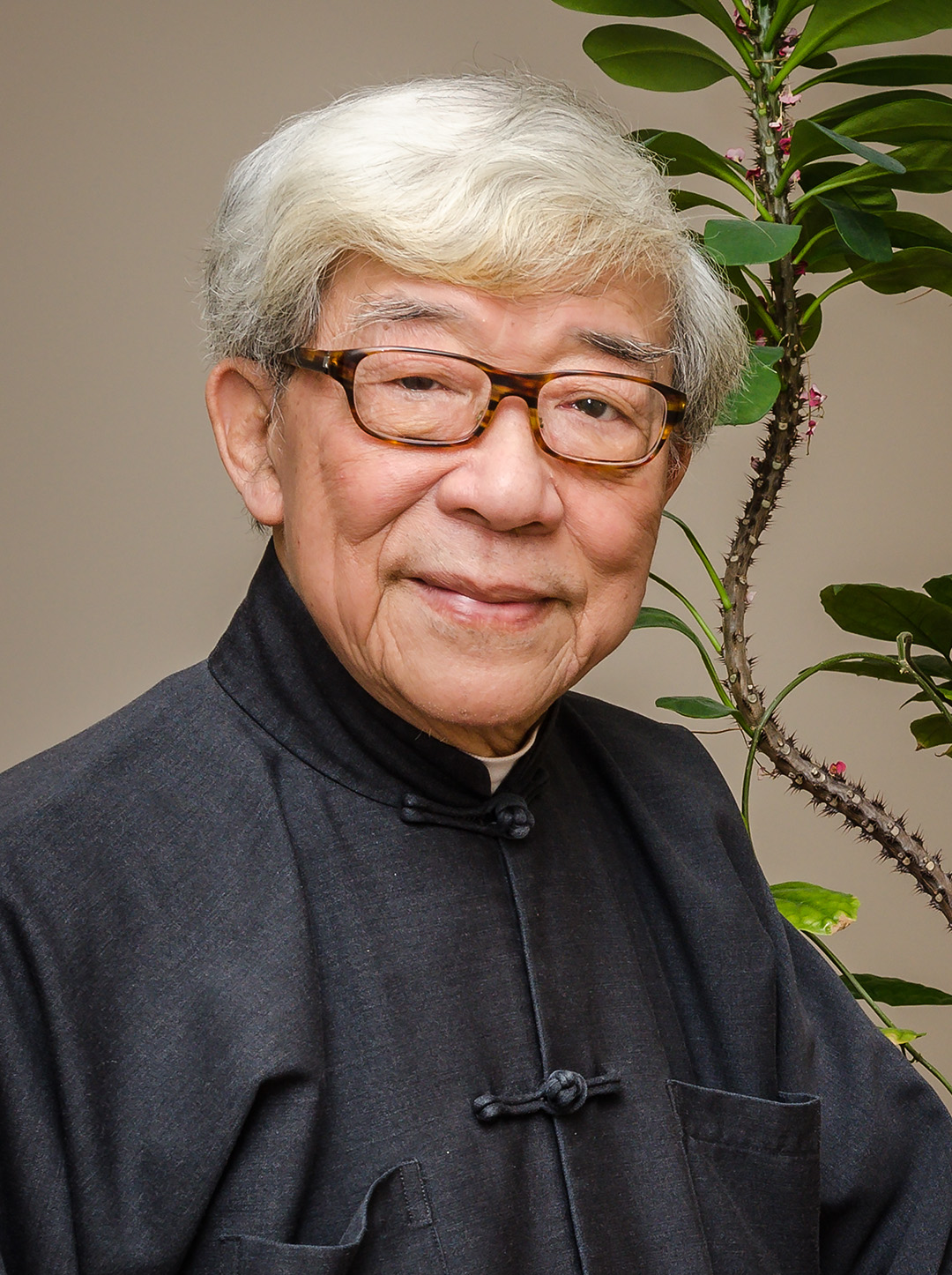
- Tam in 2015
- Born: 1935; Guangzhou, Guangdong, Republic of China
- Died: 26 October 2024 (aged 89); Toronto, Ontario, Canada
- Other name: Wang Tingzhi

Academic work
- Main interests: Buddhism

Tam Shek-wing (traditional Chinese: 談錫永; simplified Chinese: 谈锡永; Jyutping: Taam^{4} Sek^{3}-wing^{5}; pinyin: Tán Xīyǒng; 1935 – 26 October 2024), pen name Wong Ting Tze or Wang Tingzhi (Chinese: 王亭之; Jyutping: Wong^{4} Ting^{4}-ji^{1}; pinyin: Wáng Tíngzhī), was a Chinese Buddhist scholar, painter, poet, writer, and social critic, who was the founder of the Sino-Tibetan Buddhist Studies Association in North America, and a professor at Renmin University of China.

Tam was born in Guangzhou and resided in Canada.

== Biography ==
Tam Shek-wing was born in Guangdong, China in 1935. At childhood, he followed senior family members to practice Oriental Esoteric Buddhism. He was immensely interested in Buddhist texts ever since at the age of twelve while entering into the Western Sect of the Taoist practice (道家西派).

In the 60s, he started learning Tibetan Buddhism when he was converted in Taiwan under Chu Yung-kuang (屈映光上師), a disciple of Norlha Rinpoche (諾那上師) as well as Gangkar Rinpoche (貢嘎上師), and was bestowed with the teachings of the Riwoche system. Later, Chu suggested Tam to contact one of his disciples in Hong Kong - Lau Yui Chi (劉銳之上師). Subsequently, Tam joined the Hong Kong Vajrayana Esoteric Society founded by Lau. From 1972 onwards however, Tam was practising the Nyingma teachings under the direct instruction of Dudjom Rinpoche and Lau Yui Chi, and was ordained Vajra Acarya of the Nyingma School at the age of 38 by Dudjom Rinpoche. He moved to Hawaii in 1986, and has resided in Canada since 1993.

Under the guidance of Dudjom Rinpoche, Tam successively received transmitted instructions and is the lineage-holder of, among others, the following five principal Nyingma teachings:

- rgyud gsang ba snying po (Tantra of the Secret Nucleus, Guhyagarbhatantra)
- rDor sems thugs kyi sgrub pa (Sheer Clear Light)
- kar gling zhi khro dgongs pa rang grol (Peaceful and Wrathful Deities, the Natural Liberation of Intention by Karma Lingpa)
- rdo rje phur pa (Vajrakila)
- lce btsun snying tig (The Heart Essence of Chetsun)

In 1984, Tam was ordered by Dudjom Rinpoche to spread the Dharma teachings in his designated mission regions, namely North America and Mainland China.

Tam was a leading exponent of the Buddhist Tathagatagarbha thought in writings and in talks. Applying the Nyingmapa insights, he defended the Tathagatagarbha thought which was under attack by various Han and Japanese Buddhist scholars who deem it as non-Buddhist.

In later years, Tam initiated the organization of the Sino-Tibetan Buddhist Studies Association in North America, which was joined by more than twenty international scholars in the discipline. He was a professor at Renmin University of China where he gave video course lectures attended by graduate students from Beijing University, Tsinghua University, Capital University, and Minzu University of China. He later became a member of the Academic Advisory Board, Faculty of Nationalist Studies of Tsinghua University.

Tam wrote, edited or translated over 80 works in Buddhism. His other writings spread over I Ching, Chinese astrology, feng shui, fine arts, gastronomy and social critics. Wong Ting Tze (王亭之) is one of the most well known pen names of Tam for the above subjects.

Tam died in Toronto on 26 October 2024, at the age of 89.
