= Dominique Lyone =

Australian entrepreneur (1954–2024)

- Born: 11 September 1954
- Died: 25 October 2024 (aged 70)
- Occupation: Businessman
- Known for: Lyone Foundation, COS

Dominique Lyone (11 September 1954 – 25 October 2024) was an Australian businessman. He was the Chairman and Founder of COS; Australia’s largest family owned B2B supplier of office products.

== Early life ==
Dominique Lyone was born in Alexandria, Egypt on 11 September 1954. He is the son of typewriter mechanic Casimir and mother Eugenie Lyone. He has a younger sister. In 1967, his family fled Egypt for Australia during the Six-Day War. The family settled in Sydney, Australia.

== Career ==
Speaking only Arabic and French in an English speaking country made school difficult so he left at the age of 13. He got his first paid job as a telegram boy at the age of 14 and learnt to speak fluent English.

He then began an apprenticeship as a typewriter mechanic which he got by ringing companies lists in the telephone directory until he found one that was interested. Having noticed the nice cars and suits worn by the sales team he began a year and a half long campaign to convince them to let him try sales.

In 1976, he and a colleague set up their own company, Complete Office Supplies (COS). The company began trading in Parramatta in a tiny room about 3m x 3m. A year later, he bought his business partner out and continued running COS on his own. In the 1980s, COS employed 15-20 people and Dom borrowed his father’s retirement money to expand the business into retail. By negotiating with suppliers he managed to survive some tough financial times.

Now, COS employs over 350 people, has 9 distribution centres around Australia and turns over in excess of 114 million a year. Dom's daughters, Amie and Belinda have joined him as part of the executive team.

When his family arrived in Australia they needed a lot of help from charities such as St Vincent De Paul which made him believe in giving back. With this in mind, he formed the Lyone Foundation in 2013 with a commitment to contribute 15% of COS profits each year to help Australians facing challenging times. So far COS has contributed $3 million to the Lyone Foundation in 3 years.

== Death ==
Lyone died on 25 October 2024, at the age of 70.

== Influences ==
Domnique stated in a number of interviews that his greatest personal influence is his father, who he said had the courage to move his young family to a foreign country where he knew one person in order to seek a better and safer life. He is also a fan of Robert T Kiyosaki whose book, Poor Dad, Rich Dad, he attributes to kindling his interest in the study of self-improvement and ultimately to him becoming a Money and You instructor.

Business wise, he was reported to admire Jack Cowin, who was responsible for bringing the brand Hungry Jack's to Australia and overcame struggles to do so to become one of Australia’s most successful business men.

== Honours and awards ==
- 2014 Ethnic Business Awards
- 2010 Ernst & Young, Entrepreneur of the Year
