= Bernard Lagneau =

French plastic artist (1937–2024)

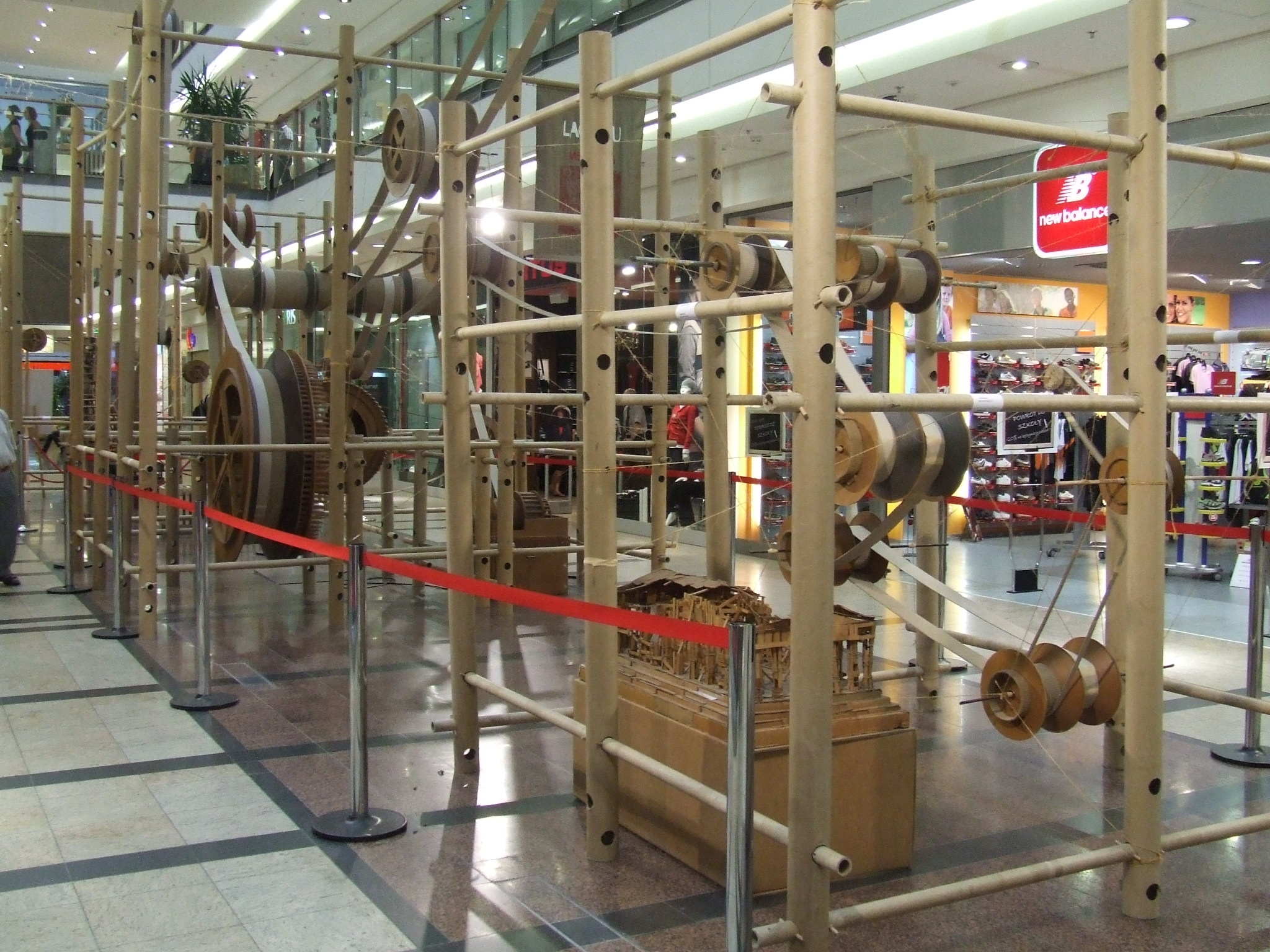
- Lagneau's machine in Kraków in 2008
- Born: 27 March 1937; Courbevoie, France
- Died: 13 October 2024 (aged 87); Die, France
- Education: École Estienne
- Occupation: Plastic artist

Bernard Lagneau (27 March 1937 – 13 October 2024) was a French plastic artist.

== Biography ==
Born in Courbevoie on 27 March 1937, Lagneau studied at the École Estienne and worked as a publishing designer from 1960 to 1970. He notably created mechanical objects made out of cardboard wheels and belts and driven by electric motors. He also designed buildings at the Maison de la Culture in Bourges, which were subsequently destroyed. Throughout his career, he held exhibitions primarily in France but also displayed his works in Romania and Germany.

Lagneau died in Die on 13 October 2024, at the age of 87.
