= Evelyn Hurley =

American nun and educator (1915–2024)

- Born: March 7, 1915; South Boston, Massachusetts, U.S.
- Died: October 16, 2024 (aged 109); Nazareth, Kentucky, U.S.
- Occupations: Nun; educator
- Years active: 1934–2014
- Known for: Long-standing career in education

Evelyn Hurley (March 7, 1915 – October 16, 2024) was an American nun and educator renowned for her extensive career as a Catholic school teacher and her dedication to religious life.

== Early life ==
Born in South Boston, Massachusetts, Evelyn Hurley was the oldest of five children born to William Francis Hurley, a prominent Boston City Councilman. She attended St. Brigid's, later known as Nazareth Academy, in South Boston, graduating in 1932.

== Education and religious life ==
Hurley entered the Sisters of Charity of Nazareth in 1932, immediately after graduation, and received her habit at the age of 17.

== Career ==
Hurley began her teaching career in 1934. Over six decades, she taught in Kentucky, Mississippi, and Massachusetts, including 45 years at St. Brigid's School in South Boston. Her teaching extended to other locations such as Covington, Kentucky, and the Archdiocese of Louisville at St. Agnes School from 1939 to 1947. She retired from active teaching in 1995 at the age of 80, but continued her ministry by visiting the sick and attending wakes and funerals until fully retiring in 2014.

== Notable accomplishments ==
Hurley's significant contributions to education were highlighted by her ability to connect with students and her enjoyment in teaching. In 2024, she celebrated 90 years as a religious sister and 60 years of teaching.

== Personal life and death ==
Hurley retired to the Sisters of Charity of Nazareth Motherhouse in Nazareth, Kentucky, where she remained active in the community.

Hurley died in Nazareth on October 16, 2024, at age 109.
