= Bantwal Jayaram Acharya =

Indian classical dancer and Yakshagana artist (1957–2024)

- Born: 12 October 1957
- Died: 21 October 2024 (aged 67)

Bantwal Jayaram Acharya (12 October 1957 – 21 October 2024) was an Indian classical dancer, stage performer and Yakshagana artist. He was known for having a transformational impact on the art of traditional dance genre Yakshagana by incorporating an element of humour which he continued for over 50 years.

== Early life ==
Acharya learnt Yakshagana, a Kannada-based traditional classical dance theatre from his father Bantwal Ganapati Acharya who was also a prominent Yakshagana artist. He grew up watching Talamaddale and Yakshagana performances since his early childhood days which provoked an inner passion in him to follow the classical cultural dance practices and traditions.

After then, he plied his trade in Yakshagana to prolong his career as a dancer. He then began performing in Amtadi and Sornadu Melas even without having gained any level of exposure to formal training.

== Career ==
Bantwal Jayaram Acharya engaged in a formal Yakshagana dance training under the guidance and auspices of his guru Padre Chandu at the Lalitha Kala Kendra of Sri Kshetra Dharmasthala. He then went onto join Kateel Mela, where he gained acknowledgement for emanating characters including Kodangi and Balagopala which he successfully managed to deliver exceeding the weight of expectations on him.

In his professional illustrious career spanning five decades, he made rapid strides as a standout professional artiste especially in Yakshagana. He had performed in Yakshagana melas of Kateel, Puttur, Sunkadakatte, Kadri, Kumble, Surathkal, Yedaneer, Hosanagara and Hanumagiri. He was attached to Hanumagiri mela from 2017 up until his untimely demise in 2024. He was acclaimed by critics for crafting a mix blend of both traditional art and humour during his stage performances calling it as paradigm shift approach to cater to wider target audience in order to elevate the essence of cultural classical traditional dance genres like Yakshagana. He was conferred with the prestigious honorary award of Karnataka Yakshagana Academy in recognition of his contributions to uplift the standards of Yakshagana genre.

== Death ==
Acharya was supposed to perform in a show at Puttige mutt in Basavanagudi with the coordination of Puttur Sri Mahalingeshwara Pravasi Yakshagana Mandali and he arrived in Bengaluru on 21 October 2024 for the particular event. He died on 21 October 2024, at the age of 67, after sustaining a cardiac arrest and dying before his anticipated performance in Bengaluru. Acharya was 67.

Following his death, as a mark of respect to him, a memorial tribute was organised by the Yakshotsava Committee of SDM Law College and Yakshagana at the SDM Law College auditorium on 22 October 2024.
