= Ismail Kalebudde =

Indian politician (1937–2024)

Member of Karnataka Legislative Council
- In office 1998–2004

Personal details
- Born: 23 November 1937
- Died: 14 October 2024 (aged 86)
- Party: Janata Parivar
- Spouse: Najmunnisa
- Children: 5 (4 sons, 1 daughter)
- Awards: Rajyotsava Award

Kale Budde Ismail Sab (23 November 1937 – 14 October 2024) was an Indian politician who served as a Member of the Karnataka Legislative Council from 1998 to 2004. He was associated with the Janata Parivar and was closely associated with Janata Dal (Secular) leader and former prime minister of India, H. D. Deve Gowda.

Ismail Kalebudde received the Rajyotsava Award, the Karnataka's second-highest civilian honor for promoting communal harmony and was instrumental in resolving the national flag-hoisting dispute at Hubli Idgah Maidan. He had been a president of Anjuman-E-Islam, Hubballi, and was a director at Anjuman Urban Co-operative Bank.

He was also a Permanent Member of the Peace Committee for the flag hoisting at the Idgah Ground in 1995. Kalebudde died on 14 October 2024.
