= Charles Olumo =

Nigerian actor (1923–2024)

Alhaji Abdulsalam Sanyaolu
- Born: Abdulsalam Sanyaolu; July 1923; Ogun State, Colony and Protectorate of Nigeria
- Died: 31 October 2024 (aged 101)
- Occupation: Actor
- Years active: 1953–2024

Alhaji Abdulsalam Sanyaolu (July 1923 – 31 October 2024), better known as Charles Olumo, was a Nigerian actor from Abeokuta, Ogun State. He mainly appeared in Yoruba-language films in "Nollywood".

== Life and career ==
Sanyaolu began acting in 1953 at a church in Lagos. He died on 31 October 2024, at the age of 101.
