= Masao Sakon =

Japanese politician (1936–2024)

- 左近 正男

Member of the House of Representatives
- In office 18 December 1983 – 27 September 1996
- Preceded by: Daiji Ioka
- Succeeded by: Constituency abolished
- Constituency: Osaka 2nd

Personal details
- Born: 26 November 1936 Osaka, Japan
- Died: 16 October 2024 (aged 87) Heguri, Nara, Japan
- Party: Socialist
- Other political affiliations: SDP (1996); NFP (1996)

Masao Sakon (Japanese: 左近 正男 Sakon Masao; 26 November 1936 – 16 October 2024) was a Japanese politician. A member of the Japan Socialist Party and later the Social Democratic Party, he served in the House of Representatives from 1983 to 1996.

Sakon died in Heguri on 16 October 2024, at the age of 87.
