= Casimir Nowotarski =

French footballer and manager (1932–2024)

Personal information
- Date of birth: 26 November 1932
- Place of birth: Wittelsheim, France
- Date of death: 16 October 2024 (aged 91)
- Height: 1.70 m (5 ft 7 in)
- Position: Forward

Senior career*
Years	Team	Apps	(Gls)
1951–1953	ASCA Wittelsheim		
1953–1954	Le Havre	31	(10)
1954–1956	Bordeaux	63	(8)
1956–1960	Lille	151	(9)
1960–1961	Strasbourg	49	(4)
1961–1963	Racing Besançon	45	(0)

Managerial career
- 1969–1971: US Évian-les-Bains
- 1971–1973: Strasbourg
- 1974–1986: Gueugnon
- * Club domestic league appearances and goals

Casimir Nowotarski (26 November 1932 – 16 October 2024) was a French footballer who played as a forward and was also a manager.

== Career ==
Born in Wittelsheim on 26 November 1932, Nowotarski notably played for Le Havre, Bordeaux, Lille, Strasbourg, and Racing Besançon. Following his playing career, he became head coach of US Évian-les-Bains before moving to his former club Strasbourg, which had just been relegated to Division 2. He managed to return the club to Division 1 the following year, but was replaced in 1973 by Robert Domergue. He took over Gueugnon in 1974, which had just been relegated to Division 3. He moved the club up to Division 2 in 1977 and won the league title in 1979.

== Death ==
Nowotarski died on 16 October 2024, at the age of 91.
