= Carlos Payan =

French Protestant pastor (1963–2024)

- Born: 1963; Lons-le-Saunier, France
- Died: 12 October 2024 (aged 60–61)
- Occupation: Pastor

Carlos Payan (1963 – 12 October 2024) was a French Protestant pastor.

== Biography ==
Born in Lons-le-Saunier, in the department of Jura, in 1963, Payan was the eighth child of Spanish republican militants. He was a member of the Mouvement Jeunes Communistes de France and worked for L'Humanité before converting to Christianity and read the New Testament; his baptism was seen as a "betrayal" to his family. He became an assistant pastor at an evangelical church and joined the Institut biblique décentralisé. He was inspired by Emiliano Tardif and joined the Embrase nos cœurs organization, where he met several Catholic and Protestant personalities. In 2003, he moved to Paris and founded his own organization, Paris tout est possible, where he organized prayers and healings. He was praised as a "speaker appreciated for his humor, his simplicity and his slightly provocative side" and an "artist before being a healer". In 2017, he prayed alongside Pope Francis alongside over 100 other evangelical pastors.

Payan died of a heart attack on 12 October 2024.
