= Arthur C. Hawkins =

American politician (1935–2024)

Member of the New Mexico House of Representatives from the 26th district
- In office 1995–1997
- Preceded by: Ramon Huerta
- Succeeded by: Rita Getty
- In office 1999–2001
- Preceded by: Rita Getty
- Succeeded by: Al Park

Personal details
- Born: November 27, 1935 Carlsbad, New Mexico, U.S.
- Died: October 14, 2024 (aged 88)
- Party: Republican
- Profession: Orthodontist

Arthur Curtis Hawkins (November 27, 1935 – October 14, 2024) was an American politician from the state of New Mexico. An orthodontist, he attended the University of New Mexico, Northwestern University and Baylor University. He served as a Republican member of the New Mexico House of Representatives, representing the Albuquerque-based 26th district. He won elections in 1994 and 1998, and lost elections in 1996 and 2000. Hawkins died on October 14, 2024, at the age of 88.

== Electoral history ==
=== 1994 ===
New Mexico House of Representatives, 26th district election, 1994 * denotes incumbent Source:
Party	Candidate	Votes	%
Republican	Arthur C. Hawkins	2,476	54.3
Democratic	Ramon Huerta*	2,081	45.7
Total votes		4,557	100

=== 1996 ===
New Mexico House of Representatives, 26th district election, 1996 * denotes incumbent Source:
Party	Candidate	Votes	%
Democratic	Rita Getty	2,533	50.1
Republican	Arthur C. Hawkins*	2,519	49.9
Total votes		5,052	100

=== 1998 ===
New Mexico House of Representatives, 26th district election, 1998 * denotes incumbent Source:
Party	Candidate	Votes	%
Republican	Arthur C. Hawkins	2,240	48.9
Democratic	Rita Getty*	2,102	45.9
Green	Andrew Homer	242	5.3
Total votes		4,584	100

=== 2000 ===
New Mexico House of Representatives, 26th district election, 2000 * denotes incumbent Source:
Party	Candidate	Votes	%
Democratic	Al Park	2,683	51.8
Republican	Arthur C. Hawkins*	2,493	48.2
Total votes		5,176	100
