= Selma Gould =

American politician (1935–2024)

Member of the New Hampshire House of Representatives
- In office 1978–1982
- Constituency: Rockingham 9th

Personal details
- Born: Selma R. Harris; November 10, 1935 Stoneham, Massachusetts, U.S.
- Died: October 15, 2024 (aged 88)
- Party: Republican

Selma R. Gould (née Harris; November 10, 1935 – October 15, 2024) was an American politician from the state of New Hampshire. She served as a Republican member of the New Hampshire House of Representatives, representing the Rockingham 9th district from 1978 to 1982. Her district covered the towns of Kingston and Plaistow. She sought election in the Rockingham 77th district in 2002 and the Rockingham 5th district in 2004, but fell short in the Republican primaries. Gould died on October 15, 2024, at the age of 88.
