= Richard Winfield =

American lawyer (1933–2024)

Richard Winfield (January 20, 1933 – October 22, 2024) was an American lawyer. He was general counsel for the Associated Press (AP) for 30 years. Over the course of his career, he represented the AP and other clients in media in hundreds of press freedom cases. Winfield died on October 22, 2024, at the age of 91.
