= Lorenzo Pepe =

Argentine politician (1931–2024)

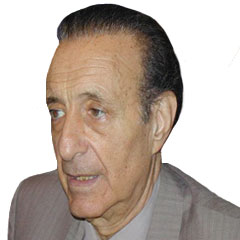
- Pepe in 2002

National Deputy
- In office 10 December 1983 – 10 December 2003
- Constituency: Buenos Aires

Personal details
- Born: Lorenzo Antonio Pepe; 22 August 1931 Sáenz Peña, Buenos Aires Province, Argentina
- Died: 14 October 2024 (aged 93)
- Party: Justicialist Party
- Education: Colegio Nacional de Buenos Aires
- Occupation: Trade unionist

Lorenzo Antonio Pepe (22 August 1931 – 14 October 2024) was an Argentine trade unionist and politician. A member of the Justicialist Party, he served in the Chamber of Deputies from 1983 to 2003.

Pepe died on 14 October 2024, at the age of 93.
