= Wiesław Łukaszewski =

Polish psychologist (1940–2024)

Wiesław Łukaszewski (9 September 1940 – 31 October 2024) was a Polish psychologist, specialising in personality psychology, social psychology, and motivational psychology. He was a professor at Szkoła Wyższa Psychologii Społecznej in Wrocław and Sopot.

== Life and career ==
Łukaszewski was born on 9 September 1940. In 1964, he graduated from the University of Warsaw, and in 1972 he completed his doctoral dissertation, becoming an assistant professor in 1974. Since 1987, he was a professor of human science.

Łukaszewski lectured at Dolnośląska Szkoła Wyższa Edukacji Towarzystwa Wiedzy Powszechnej in Wrocław, the University of Wrocław (Department of Historical and Pedagogical Science), and the University of Opole (Historical-Pedagogical Department, Institute of Psychology). He was a member of the Polish Academy of Sciences (PAN) and served as the Chairman of the Committee of Psychological Sciences PAN since 1994. He was a member of the editorial board of the scientific journals Psychological Journal, Psychological Review and Quarterly Journal of Developmental Psychology, and had cooperated with the editor of the monthly Charaktery.

Łukaszewski died on 31 October 2024, at the age of 84.

== Major books ==
- Ocena działania a wykonywanie nowych zadań, publisher Ossolineum, Wrocław 1970
- Osobowość: Struktura i funkcje regulacyjne, Wydawnictwo Naukowe PWN, Warszawa 1974
- Struktura ja a działanie w sytuacjach zadaniowych. Empiryczne studium nad funkcjami regulacyjnymi osobowości, publisher UWR, Wrocław 1982
- Szanse rozwoju osobowości, publisher KIW, Warszawa 1984
- Wielkie pytania psychologii, Gdańskie Wydawnictwo Psychologiczne, Gdańsk 2003 (winner of the Special Prize of the Minister of Science and Information Technology for academic books)
- Wytrwałość w działaniu (with Magdalena Marszał Wiśniewska), Gdańskie Wydawnictwo Psychologiczne, Gdańsk 2006
