= John Rose (socialist) =

British socialist and anti-Zionist (1945–2024)

John Rose (1945 – 30 October 2024) was a British socialist and anti-Zionist Jew who taught sociology at Southwark College and London Metropolitan University. After growing up in Harrogate as a Zionist in 1966 he went to the London School of Economics where he met Tony Cliff and was recruited to the International Socialists, later the Socialist Workers Party (UK) in 1967 amid discussions around the Six Day War. He was one of the London Recruits who undertook anti-apartheid work as a student in South Africa under the direction of the ANC. In the late 1970s he was an editor of Socialist Worker for a period.

Rose was a campaigner for Palestinian rights and the author of numerous articles and the book, The Myths of Zionism. He attended and spoke at the Cairo Anti-war Conference in the mid-2000s. He completed his PhD on Workers Power and the failure of Communism at King's College London in 2020. He died from renal failure on 30 October 2024, at the age of 79.

== Selected works ==
- Israel: The Hijack State (London: Bookmarks: 1986).
- Introduction to The Ghetto Fights: Warsaw 1941-43 by Marek Edelman (London: Bookmarks, 1995)
- The Myths of Zionism (London: Pluto, 2004) ISBN 9780745320557
- The Nakba: Why Israel’s birth was Palestine’s catastrophe and what’s the solution (London: Bookmarks, 2008) (with Anne Alexander)
- Revolutions Thwarted: Poland, South Africa, Iran, Brazil and the legacies of Communism (London: Bookmarks, 2025, forthcoming)
