= Vladimir Piskunov =

Russian politician (1941–2024)

- Владимир Пискунов

Member of the Soviet of Nationalities
- In office 11 April 1984 – 25 May 1989

Personal details
- Born: Vladimir Venediktovich Piskunov; 8 April 1941 Cheremkhovo, Irkutsk Oblast, Russian SFSR, USSR
- Died: 5 October 2024 (aged 83) Moscow, Russia
- Party: CPSU
- Education: Irkutsk State Technical University
- Occupation: Businessman, politician

Vladimir Venediktovich Piskunov (Russian: Владимир Венедиктович Пискунов; 8 April 1941 – 5 October 2024) was a Soviet and Russian businessman and politician. A member of the Communist Party of the Soviet Union, he served in the Soviet of Nationalities from 1984 to 1989.

Piskunov died on 5 October 2024, at the age of 83.
