= Lilibert =

Luxembourgish lyricist (1923–2024)

- Born: Elisabeth Bertram; 30 November 1923; Luxembourg City, Luxembourg
- Died: 3 October 2024 (aged 100)
- Occupation: Lyricist

Elisabeth Bertram (30 November 1923 – 3 October 2024), better known as Lilibert, was a Luxembourgish lyricist. She notably wrote lyrics for schlager singers Will Brandes, Bernd Spier, Karel Gott, Anita Hegerland, and Ann & Andy. Her notable songs included Bernd Spier's version of "Memphis, Tennessee".
