= Lino Falzon =

Maltese footballer (1941–2024)

Personal information
- Date of birth: 9 April 1941
- Place of birth: Mosta, Malta
- Date of death: 3 October 2024 (aged 83)
- Position: Defender

Senior career*
Years	Team	Apps	(Gls)
?–1962	Mosta Athletic		
1962–1969	Sliema Wanderers		
1969–?	Mosta		

International career
1962–1966	Malta	4	(0)
1964	Malta XI	1	(0)
- * Club domestic league appearances and goals

Lino Falzon (9 April 1941 – 3 October 2024) was a Maltese footballer who played as a defender.

== Club career ==
After starting his career at hometown club Mosta Athletic, Falzon made his debut for top-tier side Sliema Wanderers in January 1963. He played 91 games for them in all competitions and won league titles and domestic cups, before returning to Mosta after seven seasons.

== International career ==
Falzon made his debut for Malta in a June 1962 European Championship qualification match away against Denmark, which also happened to be his county's competitive debut. He earned a total of five caps (one unofficial). Falzon was a Mosta Athletic player in the second Division at his debut, becoming only the second player to represent his country while active in the second tier. His final international was a March 1966 friendly match away against Libya.

== Death ==
Falzon died on 3 October 2024, at the age of 83.
