= Les Jarry =

Australian rules footballer (1928–2024)

Personal information
- Full name: Leslie Alexander Jarry
- Born: 28 September 1928
- Died: 16 October 2024 (aged 96)
- Height: 183 cm (6 ft 0 in)
- Weight: 83 kg (183 lb)

Playing career
| Years | Club | Games (Goals) |
| 1948–49 | South Melbourne | 21 (10) |

Leslie Alexander Jarry (28 September 1928 – 16 October 2024) was an Australian rules footballer who played with South Melbourne in the Victorian Football League (VFL).
