= Mijo Beccaria =

French editor (1933–2024)

- Born: Marie-Josèphe Denoix de Saint Marc; 4 November 1933; Lyon, France
- Died: 3 October 2024 (aged 90); Paris, France
- Education: University of Bordeaux
- Occupation: Editor

Mijo Beccaria, née Marie-Josèphe Denoix de Saint Marc, (4 November 1933 – 3 October 2024) was a French editor.

== Biography ==
Born in Lyon on 4 November 1933, Beccaria was born into a noble family from Périgord. She was the younger sister of French Resistance fighter Hélie de Saint Marc. She was educated at the Institution des Dames du Sacré-Cœur in Bordeaux and the Faculty of Letters at the University of Bordeaux. She served as Secretary-General of the women's wing of Jeunesse Étudiante Chrétienne from 1953 to 1956, where she met her husband, editor Yves Beccaria. She was closely linked with Catholic Rural Youth as a consultant with IFOCAP until 1965.

In 1970, Beccaria joined La Maison de la bonne presse in 1970, which merged into Bayard Presse. In 1966, she co-founded the magazine Pomme d'Api with Anne-Marie de Besombes following inspiration from her husband. She also participated in the creation of youth magazines such as Okapi, J'aime lire, Astrapi, Phosphore, and Popi. In 1994, she became director-general of the Bayard group before serving on its management board. She also served as vice-president of the board of directors of Orphelins apprentis d'Auteuil and served on the advisory board on sexual abuse of the Bishops' Conference of France. She was later named Commander of the Legion of Honour.

Beccaria died in Paris on 3 October 2024, at the age of 90.
