= Simona-Maya Teodoroiu =

Romanian judge and politician (1969–2024)

Member of the Chamber of Deputies of Romania for Prahova County
- In office 21 December 2020 – 8 October 2024

Judge of the Constitutional Court of Romania
- In office February 2015 – July 2019
- Preceded by: Toni Greblă
- Succeeded by: Cristian Deliorga

Personal details
- Born: 9 July 1969 Ploiești, Romania
- Died: 8 October 2024 (aged 55)
- Party: PSD
- Education: University of Bucharest
- Occupation: Judge

Simona-Maya Teodoroiu (9 July 1969 – 8 October 2024) was a Romanian judge and politician. A member of the Social Democratic Party, she served on the Constitutional Court from 2015 to 2019 and was a member of the Chamber of Deputies from 2020 to 2024.

Teodoroiu died on 8 October 2024, at the age of 55.
