= Francisco Javier Carrera Noriega =

Spanish politician (1965–2024)

Member of the Cortes of Castile and León for Valladolid
- In office 10 March 2022 – 9 October 2024

Personal details
- Born: 24 March 1965 Llanes, Spain
- Died: 9 October 2024 (aged 59) Valladolid, Spain
- Party: Vox

Francisco Javier Carrera Noriega (24 March 1965 – 9 October 2024) was a Spanish politician. A member of Vox, he served in the Cortes of Castile and León from 2022 to 2024.

Carrera died of cancer in Valladolid, on 9 October 2024, at the age of 59.
