= Gilda Holst =

Ecuadorian writer and academic (1952–2024)

- Born: Gilda Holst Molestina; June 3, 1952; Guayaquil, Ecuador
- Died: October 22, 2024 (aged 72)
- Education: Universidad Católica de Santiago de Guayaquil
- Occupation(s): Writer, academic

Gilda Holst Molestina (June 3, 1952 – October 22, 2024) was an Ecuadorian writer and academic. Her narrative made use of humor and irony, in addition to the treatment of themes related to gender inequality.

== Biography ==
Gilda Holst was born in Guayaquil on June 3, 1952. She completed her secondary studies at the American College, and higher education at the Universidad Católica de Santiago de Guayaquil, where she obtained a licentiate in literature in 1984.

She began her literary career in the 1980s. In 1985, she entered the literary workshops of writer Miguel Donoso Pareja. Her first book of short stories, Más sin nombre que nunca, was published in 1989, and included the short story "Reunión", the plot of which follows a woman who is rejected by her husband and friends because of her body odor. This received great critical interest for her exploration of the feminine perspective in masculine environments.

She also dedicated herself to teaching, working for several years as a professor of literature at the Universidad Católica, where she eventually directed the School of Letters.

Regarding her writing, the Venezuelan writer José Balza observes:

(...) she has an airy and suggestive language; she handles description and brief dialogue as style incisions; she operates on the magnetism of the city, the river and beaches. Humor and tenderness are replaced in her stories. And yet the density of her perceptions converts her stories into a new stratum of literary sensibility. Gil Holst writes that which none of us has thought of yet.

Her Complete Works were published by Editorial Cadáver Exquisito in 2021.

Holst died on October 22, 2024, at the age of 72.

== Works ==
=== Short stories ===
- Más sin nombre que nunca (1989)
- Turba de signos (1995), ISBN 9789978610657
- Bumerán (2006)

=== Novels ===
- Dar con ella (2000)

=== Featured in anthologies ===
- El lugar de las palabras (Guayaquil, 1986)
- El muro y la intemperie (Hanover, 1989), ISBN 9780910061414
- El libro de los abuelos (Guayaquil, 1990)
- Así en la tierra como en los sueños (Quito, 1991)
- ¡A que sí! (1993), ISBN 9781413003901
- Cuento contigo (Guayaquil, 1993)
- Veintiún cuentistas ecuatorianos (Quito, 1996)
- Antología de narradoras ecuatorianas (Guayaquil 1997), ISBN 9789978803912
- Cuento latinoamericano del siglo XXI (Mexico, 1997), ISBN 9789682320811
- Dos veces buenos # 2. Más cuentos breves latinoamericanos (Buenos Aires, 1997)
- Cruel Fictions, Cruel Realities: Short Stories by Latin American Women Writers (Pittsburgh, 1997), ISBN 9780935480870
- 40 cuentos ecuatorianos (Guayaquil, 1997)
- Antología básica del cuento ecuatoriano (Quito, 1998)
- Cuento ecuatoriano de finales del siglo XX (Quito, 1999), ISBN 9789978805060
- Cuento ecuatoriano contemporáneo (Mexico, 2001)
- Gilda Holst: Obra Completa (Guayaquil, 2021)
