= Tadashi Ushijima =

Japanese politician (1931–2024)

Tadashi Ushijimi
- 牛嶋正

Member of the House of Councillors
- In office 26 July 1992 – 25 July 1998
- Constituency: National PR

Personal details
- Born: 25 February 1931 Hyōgo Prefecture, Japan
- Died: 5 October 2024 (aged 93) Ōbu, Aichi, Japan
- Party: Komeito
- Other political affiliations: CGP (1992–1994); NFP (1994–1998)
- Education: Kyoto University; Osaka University
- Occupation: Economist

Tadashi Ushijima (Japanese: 牛嶋正 Ushijima Tadashi; 25 February 1931 – 5 October 2024) was a Japanese economist and politician. A member of Komeito and the New Frontier Party, he served in the House of Councillors from 1992 to 1998.

Ushijima died in Ōbu on 5 October 2024, at the age of 93.
