= Tony Kehrer =

Canadian football player (1937–2024)

No. 90
- Position: Halfback

Personal information
- Born: January 16, 1937; Winnipeg, Manitoba, Canada
- Died: October 30, 2024 (aged 87); Winnipeg, Manitoba, Canada
- Listed height: 5 ft 9 in (1.75 m)
- Listed weight: 190 lb (86 kg)

Career history
- 1958–1960: Winnipeg Blue Bombers
- 1962–1963: Edmonton Eskimos

Awards and highlights
- Grey Cup champion (1958, 1959)

Tony Kehrer (January 16, 1937 – October 30, 2024) was a Canadian professional football player who played for the Winnipeg Blue Bombers and Edmonton Eskimos. He won the Grey Cup with Winnipeg in 1958 and 1959. He played junior football for the Rods and won two championships in 1956 in Winnipeg and 1957 in Toronto.
