= Gloria Wing =

American politician (1931–2024)

Member of the Vermont House of Representatives from the Lamoille 2 district
- In office 1987 – March 1990

Personal details
- Born: July 5, 1931 Morristown, Vermont, U.S.
- Died: October 28, 2024 (aged 93)
- Party: Republican

Gloria Ann Wing (July 5, 1931 – October 28, 2024) was an American politician from the state of Vermont. She served as a Republican member of the Vermont House of Representatives from 1987 until her resignation in March 1990, representing the Lamoille 2nd district. Wing died on October 28, 2024, at the age of 93.
