= Aurélien Ferenczi =

French journalist and film critic (1962–2024)

- Born: 26 October 1962
- Died: 9 October 2024 (aged 61)
- Occupations: Journalist; Film critic

Aurélien Ferenczi (26 October 1962 – 9 October 2024) was a French journalist and film critic.

== Life and career ==
Born on 26 October 1962, Ferenczi was the brother of journalist Thomas Ferenczi. He served as deputy editor-in-chief of the magazine Télérama and had a blog titled Cinécure. He also worked on the Canal+ show Le Cercle. In 2019, he was fired from Télérama for "sexist behavior, sexual harassment and moral harassment". He disputed the allegations and announced his intentions to fight his termination in court. In May 2021, the Labour Court ruled that the magazine was liable for wrongful dismissal.

Ferenczi died of a heart attack on 9 October 2024, at the age of 61.

== Publications ==
- Lars von Trier (1997)
- Quentin Tarantino (1997)
- Fritz Lang (2007)
- Tim Burton (2007)
- Framboise, quelques hypothèses sur Françoise Dorléac (2024)

== Filmography ==
- Serpent's Path (2024)
