= Vladimir Mikushevich =

Russian poet, translator and philosopher (1936–2024)

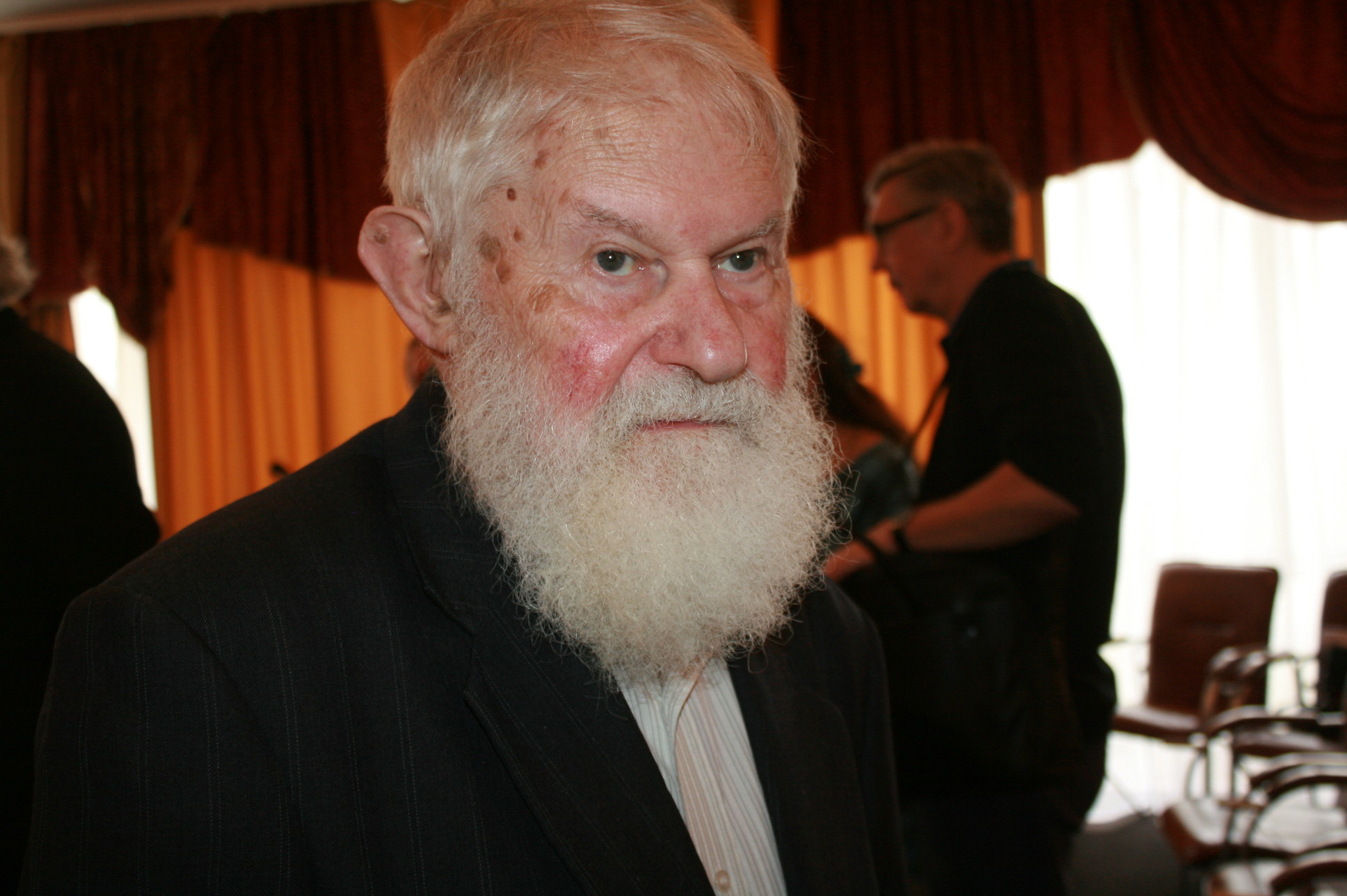
- Mikushevich in 2018
- Born: 5 July 1936
- Died: 23 October 2024 (aged 88)
- Occupation: Poet, translator, philosopher

Vladimir Mikushevich (5 July 1936 – 23 October 2024) was a Russian poet, translator, and philosopher. He died on 23 October 2024, at the age of 88. He graduated from the Moscow State Institute of Foreign Languages and worked as a lecturer at the Moscow Literary Institute and the Institute of Journalism and Literary Creation.
