= Gerd Peehs =

German footballer (1942–2024)

Personal information
- Date of birth: 21 January 1942
- Place of birth: Neuscheidt, Germany
- Date of death: 24 October 2024 (aged 82)
- Place of death: Sarreguemines, France
- Height: 1.78 m (5 ft 10 in)
- Position: Defender

Senior career*
Years	Team	Apps	(Gls)
1963–1965	SV Saar 05 Saarbrücken		
1965–1966	Borussia Neunkirchen	20	(0)
1966–1973	Borussia Dortmund	181	(4)
- * Club domestic league appearances and goals

Gerd Peehs (21 January 1942 – 24 October 2024) was a German professional footballer who played as a defender. He spent seven seasons in the Bundesliga with Borussia Neunkirchen and Borussia Dortmund. He died in Sarreguemines, France, on 24 October 2024, at the age of 82.
