= Anna Maslova =

Russian politician (1934–2024)

- Анна Маслова

Member of the Soviet of the Union
- In office 1979–1989

Personal details
- Born: Anna Vasilyevna Maslova; 20 October 1934 Kuchki, Penza, Penza Oblast, Russian SFSR, USSR
- Died: October 2024 (aged 89)
- Party: CPSU
- Occupation: Electrician

Anna Vasilyevna Maslova (Russian: А́нна Васи́льевна Ма́слова; 20 October 1934 – October 2024) was a Russian electrician and politician. A member of the Communist Party of the Soviet Union, she served in the Soviet of the Union from 1979 to 1989.

Maslova died in October 2024, at the age of 89.
