= Rafik Ben Salah =

Tunisian-Swiss writer (1948–2024)

- Born: 31 March 1948; Moknine, French Tunisia
- Died: 14 October 2024 (aged 76); Moudon, Switzerland
- Education: University of Paris
- Occupation: Writer

Rafik Ben Salah (31 March 1948 – 14 October 2024) was a Tunisian-Swiss writer.

== Biography ==
Born in Moknine on 31 March 1948, Ben Salah attended primary and secondary school in Tunisia. At the age of 20, he moved to Paris and attended the University of Paris, where he earned a degree in journalism. After his studies, he moved to Switzerland and worked as a teacher in Paudex and Moudon, leading lessons in French and history.

In 1987, Ben Salah received the Prix de la meilleure œuvre franco-maghrébine for Retour d'exil. In 1992, he was awarded the Schiller Prize for Lettres scellées au président and in 1999 he won the Prix Lipp Suisse for Le harem en péril. In 2004, he won the Prix des écrivains vaudois, awarded by the Association vaudoise des écrivains. In 2006, he won the special jury prize of the COMAR d'Or for La Mort du Sid, and in 2012 he won the same award for Les Caves du minustaire. A member of several associations, mostly notably of which included the Olten Group.

Ben Salah died in Moudon, on 14 October 2024, at the age of 76.

== Publications ==
- Retour d'exil : ou Sang femme (1987)
- Lettres scellées au président (1991)
- La Prophétie du chameau (1993)
- Küsse und eilige Rosen : die fremdsprachige Schweizer Literatur, ein Lesebuch (1998)
- Le Harem en péril : et autres nouvelles (1999)
- L'Œil du frère (2001)
- Récits de Tunisie (2004)
- La Mort du Sid : roman (2005)
- La véritable histoire de Gayoum Ben Tell : annotée par l'écrivain lausannois Ibn Sallaz (2007)
- L'Invasion des criquets de terre : et autres nouvelles de la dérive ordinaire (2009)
- Les Caves du minustaire : roman (2011)
- Drames de femmes et autres trames : nouvelles (2016)
- Récits d'Helvétie (2019)
