= Vyacheslav Nikiforov =

Russian footballer (1966–2024)

Personal information
- Full name: Vyacheslav Vladimirovich Nikiforov
- Date of birth: 7 October 1966
- Place of birth: Kaliningrad, Russian SFSR, USSR
- Date of death: 13 October 2024 (aged 58)
- Place of death: Kaliningrad, Russia
- Height: 1.84 m (6 ft 0 in)
- Position: Midfielder

Youth career
- SDYuSShOR-5 Yunost Kaliningrad

Senior career*
Years	Team	Apps	(Gls)
1983–1984	Baltika Kaliningrad	35	(0)
1985–1987	Dinamo Minsk	0	(0)
1987–1993	Baltika Kaliningrad	227	(47)
1994	Lada Dimitrovgrad	30	(2)
1995–1997	Baltika Kaliningrad	69	(3)
1997	CSK VVS-Kristall Smolensk	0	(0)
1997	FC Stroykomplekt Kaliningrad		
1997	FC Veteran Kaliningrad		
1998	FC Baltika-FSh Kaliningrad		
1998–2001	FC Veteran Kaliningrad		

Managerial career
- 2000–2004: Baltika Kaliningrad (administrator)
- 2006–2007: Baltika-2 Kaliningrad (administrator)
- 2007: Baltika-2 Kaliningrad (director)
- * Club domestic league appearances and goals

Vyacheslav Vladimirovich Nikiforov (Russian: Вячеслав Владимирович Никифоров; 7 October 1966 – 13 October 2024) was a Russian footballer who played as a midfielder. He played for the main squad of Dinamo Minsk in the USSR Federation Cup. Nikiforov died on 13 October 2024, at the age of 58.
