= Kenzhebek Ukin =

Kazakh politician (1940–2024)

- Кенжебек Үкин

Head of the Kostanay Region
- In office February 1992 – October 1993
- Preceded by: position established
- Succeeded by: Baltash Tursymbaev (as Akim)

Member of the Supreme Soviet of the Kazakh Soviet Socialist Republic/Supreme Council of Kazakhstan
- In office 1985–1993

Personal details
- Born: Kenzhebek Ukinovich Ukin; 26 July 1940 Koytas, East Kazakhstan Region, Kazakh SSR, Soviet Union
- Died: October 2024 (aged 84)
- Party: CPSU (until 1991)
- Education: Abai Kazakh National Pedagogical University; Semipalatinsk Zooveterinary Institute; Almaty Higher Party School
- Occupation: Schoolteacher; politician

Kenzhebek Ukinovich Ukin (Kazakh: Кенжебек Үкіұлы Үкин, romanized: Kenjebek Ükıūly Ükin; 26 July 1940 – October 2024) was a Kazakh schoolteacher and politician. A member of the Communist Party of the Soviet Union, he served in the Supreme Soviet of the Kazakh Soviet Socialist Republic/Supreme Council of Kazakhstan from 1985 to 1993 and was head of the Kostanay Region from 1992 to 1993.

Ukin died in October 2024, at the age of 84.
