= Pavla Vošahlíková =

Czech historian (1951–2024)

Pavla Vošahlíková (20 March 1951 – 5 October 2024) was a Czech historian. Her specialisation was the history of Czech in 19th and the first half of the 20th century.

Vošahlíková was born in Prague on 20 March 1951. In 1974 she defended her PhD thesis on the Charles University in Prague. She was member of the Department of Biographical Studies of the Institute of History of the Czech Academy of Sciences.

Vošahlíková was an editor of Biografický slovník českých zemí from 2004 to 2012. She was member of the editorial board of Polski Słownik Biograficzny.

Vošahlíková collaborated with the Czech Radio. She died on 5 October 2024, at the age of 73.

== Works ==
- Slovenské politické směry v období přechodu k imperiaIismu. Praha : Academia, 1979.
- Československá sociální demokracie a Národní fronta. Praha : Academia, 1985.
- Jak se žilo za časů Františka Josefa I. Praha : Svoboda, 1996.
- Zlaté časy reklamy. Praha : Karolinum, 1999.
- Cesty k samostatnosti. Portréty žen v éře modernizace. Praha : Historický ústav, 2010. (co-author)
