= Marie-Christine Schrijen =

Belgian-born French photographer (1941–2024)

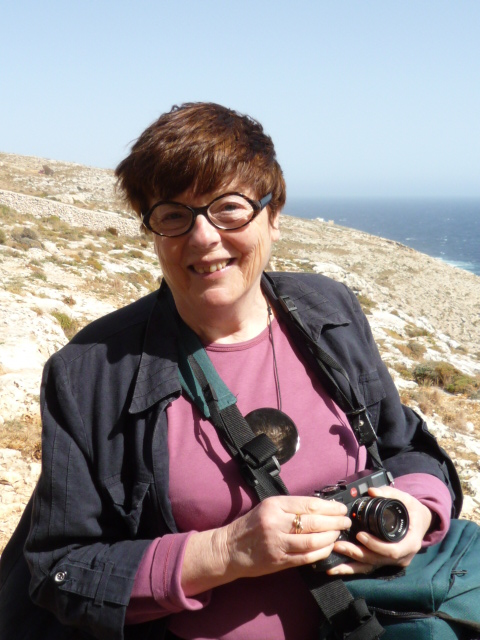
- Schrijen (2013)
- Born: 1941; Etterbeek, German-occupied Belgium and Northern France
- Died: 17 October 2024 (aged 82–83); Nîmes, France
- Occupation: Photographer

Marie-Christine Schrijen (1941 – 17 October 2024) was a Belgian-born French photographer.

== Biography ==
Born in Etterbeek in 1941, Schrijen acquired French nationality in 1951. She studied letters in Rabat at the Lycée agricole de Témara and became a member of the Association Internationale de la Critique Littéraire. She held a wide variety of personal exhibitions, including at Photofolies in 2011, held in Onet-le-Château.

Schrijen died in Nîmes on 17 October 2024.
