= Dominique Quéhec =

French actor and stage director (1937–2024)

- Born: 27 August 1937; Toulouse, France
- Died: 8 October 2024 (aged 87)
- Education: Conservatoire de Rennes
- Occupations: Actor; Stage director

Dominique Quéhec (27 August 1937 – 8 October 2024) was a French actor and stage director. He worked as a director at multiple theatres, notably the Théâtre national de Chaillot, the Théâtre National de Bretagne, and the Opéra Bastille.
