= Emo Danesi =

Italian politician (1935–2024)

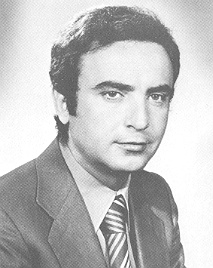

Member of the Chamber of Deputies of Italy for Pisa
- In office 5 July 1976 – 11 July 1983

Personal details
- Born: 19 July 1935 Livorno, Italy
- Died: 6 October 2024 (aged 89) Rome, Italy
- Party: DC

Emo Danesi (19 July 1935 – 6 October 2024) was an Italian politician. A member of Christian Democracy, he served in the Chamber of Deputies from 1976 to 1983.

Danesi died in Rome on 6 October 2024, at the age of 89.
