= Monique Knowlton =

German-American model (1937–2024)

Monique Knowlton (May 24, 1937 – October 8, 2024) was a German-American model and gallerist. In 1981, her Upper East Side gallery was described by The New York Times as a “hospitable haven, in which to be outrageous counts as a plus.” Knowlton died on October 8, 2024, at the age of 87.
