= Saimin Redjosentono =

Surinamese politician (1940–2024)

Minister of Agriculture, Livestock and Fishery
- In office 1996–2000
- Preceded by: Johan Sisal
- Succeeded by: Geetapersad Gangaram Panday
- In office 1988–1990
- Preceded by: Cornelis Ardjosemito
- Succeeded by: A.L. Zalmijn

Personal details
- Born: 16 December 1940
- Died: 15 October 2024 (aged 83)
- Party: KTPI
- Education: Royal Academy of Art, The Hague
- Occupation: Teacher

Saimin Redjosentono (16 December 1940 – 15 October 2024) was a Surinamese teacher and politician. A member of the Party for National Unity and Solidarity, he served as Minister of Agriculture, Livestock and Fishery from 1988 to 1990 and again from 1996 to 2000.

Redjosentono died on 15 October 2024, at the age of 83.
