= Baltazar Ushca =

Ecuadorian ice harvester (1944–2024)

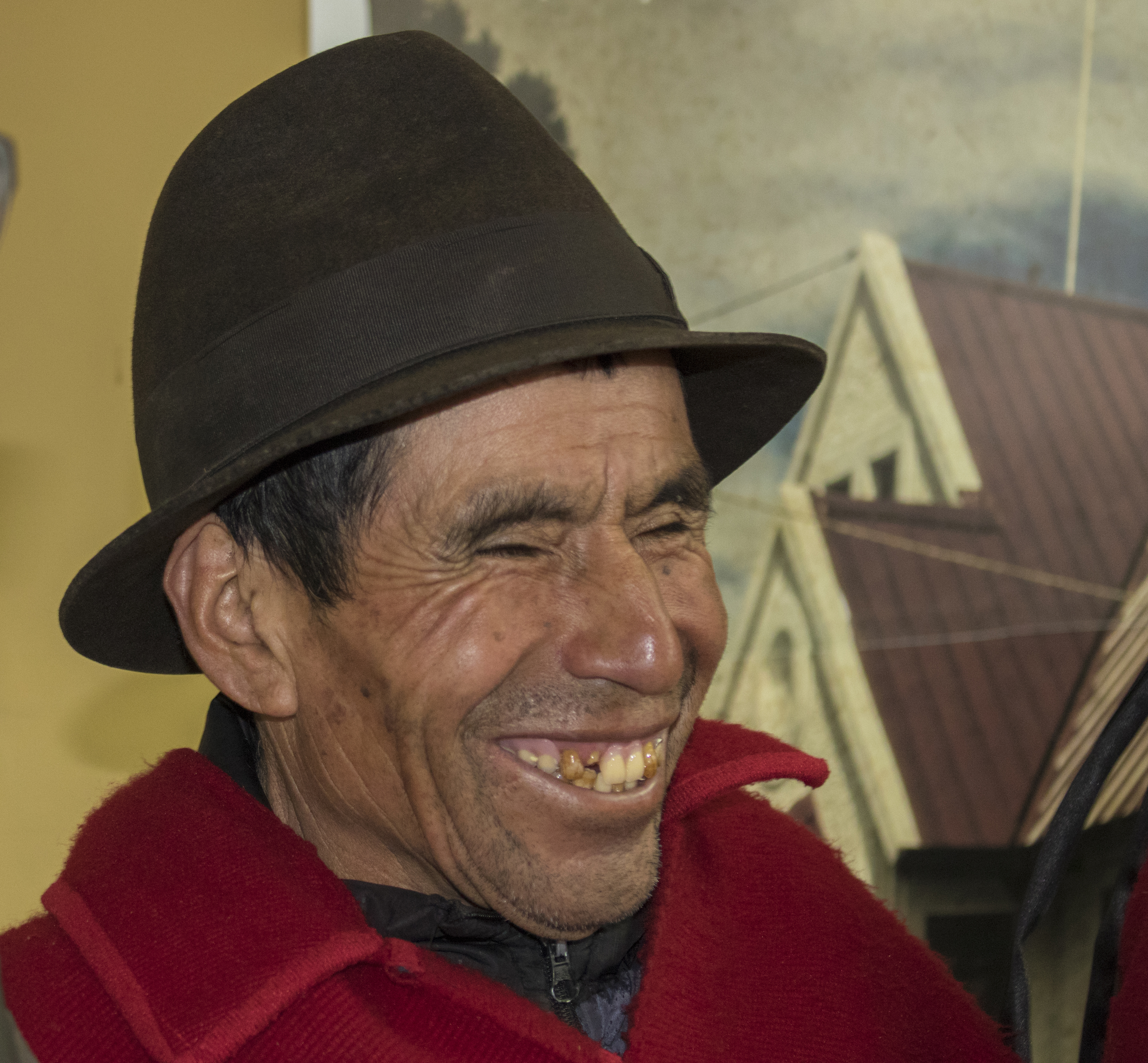
- Ushca in 2018
- Born: 12 May 1944; Riobamba, Ecuador
- Died: 11 October 2024 (aged 80)
- Occupation: Ice harvester
- Height: 4 ft 11 (Note: Ushca was 4 foot 11 in 2012) in (150 cm)

Baltazar Ushca (12 May 1944 – 11 October 2024) was an Ecuadorian ice harvester. He was perhaps best known for being the last iceman of Chimborazo.

Ushca died from injuries suffered after being charged by a bull on 11 October 2024, at the age of 80.
