= Edna Tepava =

French model (1955–2024)

- Born: 1955
- Died: 6 October 2024 (aged 69); France
- Occupation: Model

Edna Tepava (1955 – 6 October 2024) was a French model and beauty pageant competitor.

Tepava was named Miss Tahiti in 1973 and Miss France 1974, the first Polynesian to win the title.

== Biography ==
Born in 1955, Tepava worked as a secretary in Papeete. She was elected Miss Tahiti on 7 July 1973, which qualified her for the Miss France competition. She was elected to that title on 29 December 1973 at the Grand-Hôtel in Paris. Following her coronation, she participated in the Miss Europe and the Miss World competitions, but did not place.

Tepava died on 6 October 2024, at the age of 69.
