= Francisco Tomey =

Spanish politician (1946–2024)

Member of the Senate of Spain for Guadalajara
- In office 6 June 1993 – 4 April 2000
- In office 22 June 1986 – 20 November 1989

Member of the Congress of Deputies for Guadalajara
- In office 21 November 1989 – 13 April 1993

Personal details
- Born: Francisco Tomey Gómez; 28 March 1946 Madrid, Spain
- Died: 2 October 2024 (aged 78) Guadalajara, Spain
- Party: PP
- Occupation: Journalist

Francisco Tomey Gómez (28 March 1946 – 2 October 2024) was a Spanish journalist and politician. A member of the People's Party, he served in the Senate from 1986 to 1989 and from 1993 to 2000 and was a member of the Congress of Deputies from 1989 to 1993.

Tomey died in Guadalajara on 2 October 2024, at the age of 78.
