= Daira Galvis =

Colombian lawyer and politician (1952 or 1953 – 2024)

Daira Galvis (1952 or 1953 – 28 October 2024) was a Colombian lawyer and politician who served as a senator. She died on 28 October 2024, at the age of 71.
