= Margaret Porter =

American politician

Member of the New Hampshire House of Representatives from the Merrimack 8th district
- In office 2006–2010

Personal details
- Party: Democratic

Margaret E. Porter is a Democratic former member of the New Hampshire House of Representatives who represented the Merrimack 8th district from 2006 to 2010.
