= 1987 Spanish local elections in the Balearic Islands =

This article presents the results breakdown of the local elections held in the Balearic Islands on 10 June 1987. The following tables show detailed results in the autonomous community's most populous municipalities, sorted alphabetically.

== City control ==
The following table lists party control in the most populous municipalities, including provincial capitals (highlighted in bold). Gains for a party are highlighted in that party's colour.

Municipality	Population	Previous control	New control
Ciutadella de Menorca	18,905	Spanish Socialist Workers' Party (PSOE)	Spanish Socialist Workers' Party (PSOE)
Ibiza	27,384	People's Alliance–Liberal Party (AP–PL)	Spanish Socialist Workers' Party (PSOE) (PP in 1989)
Inca	21,701	Majorcan Union (UM)	Majorcan Union (UM)
Llucmajor	15,505	People's Alliance–Liberal Party (AP–PL)	Spanish Socialist Workers' Party (PSOE)
Manacor	24,345	People's Alliance–Liberal Party (AP–PL)	Spanish Socialist Workers' Party (PSOE)
Maó-Mahón	21,627	Spanish Socialist Workers' Party (PSOE)	Spanish Socialist Workers' Party (PSOE)
**Palma**	295,136	Spanish Socialist Workers' Party (PSOE)	Spanish Socialist Workers' Party (PSOE)
Santa Eulària des Riu	14,059	People's Alliance–Liberal Party (AP–PL)	People's Alliance–Liberal Party (AP–PL)

== Municipalities ==
=== Ciutadella de Menorca ===
Population: 18,905

← Summary of the 10 June 1987 City Council of Ciutadella de Menorca election results →
Parties and alliances	Popular vote			Seats	
Parties and alliances	Votes	%	±pp	Total	+/−
People's Alliance–Liberal Party (AP–PL)^{1}	3,626	40.27	+6.97	7	+1
Spanish Socialist Workers' Party (PSOE)	3,311	36.77	+7.17	7	+1
Agreement of the Left of Menorca (PSM–EU)	1,090	12.10	−4.80	2	−1
Democratic and Social Centre (CDS)	827	9.18	+6.24	1	+1
Independents (INDEP)	n/a	n/a	−12.55	0	−2
Blank ballots	151	1.68	+1.68		
Total	9,005			17	±0
Valid votes	9,005	99.52	−0.48		
Invalid votes	43	0.48	+0.48		
Votes cast / turnout	9,048	65.44	−0.24		
Abstentions	4,779	34.56	+0.24		
Registered voters	13,827				
Sources
Footnotes: ^{1} People's Alliance–Liberal Party results are compared to People's Coalition totals in the 1983 election.

=== Ibiza ===
Population: 27,384

← Summary of the 10 June 1987 City Council of Ibiza election results →
Parties and alliances	Popular vote			Seats	
Parties and alliances	Votes	%	±pp	Total	+/−
Spanish Socialist Workers' Party (PSOE)	4,243	42.43	−0.13	9	−1
People's Alliance–Liberal Party (AP–PL)^{1}	3,948	39.48	−3.66	9	−1
Democratic and Social Centre (CDS)	1,299	12.99	New	3	+3
United Left (EU–IU)	407	4.07	+0.43	0	±0
Liberal Democratic Party (PDL)	n/a	n/a	−7.52	0	−1
Blank ballots	102	1.02	+1.02		
Total	9,999			21	±0
Valid votes	9,999	98.75	−1.25		
Invalid votes	127	1.25	+1.25		
Votes cast / turnout	10,126	53.59	+2.81		
Abstentions	8,768	46.41	−2.81		
Registered voters	18,894				
Sources
Footnotes: ^{1} People's Alliance–Liberal Party results are compared to People's Coalition totals in the 1983 election.; ^{2} United Left results are compared to Communist Party of the Balearic Islands totals in the 1983 election.

=== Inca ===
Population: 21,701

← Summary of the 10 June 1987 City Council of Inca election results →
Parties and alliances	Popular vote			Seats	
Parties and alliances	Votes	%	±pp	Total	+/−
Majorcan Union (UM)	4,751	45.60	−4.21	11	−1
Spanish Socialist Workers' Party (PSOE)	2,545	24.43	+4.70	6	+2
People's Alliance–Liberal Party (AP–PL)^{1}	1,348	12.94	−2.47	3	±0
Democratic and Social Centre (CDS)	681	6.54	+4.72	1	+1
Socialist Party of Mallorca–Nationalist Left (PSM–EN)	388	3.72	−3.28	0	−1
United Left (EU–IU)^{2}	316	3.03	−3.20	0	−1
People's Democratic Party (PDP)	240	2.30	New	0	±0
Blank ballots	75	0.72	+0.72		
Total	10,419			21	±0
Valid votes	10,419	99.10	−0.90		
Invalid votes	95	0.90	+0.90		
Votes cast / turnout	10,514	74.61	+9.22		
Abstentions	3,578	25.39	−9.22		
Registered voters	14,092				
Sources
Footnotes: ^{1} People's Alliance–Liberal Party results are compared to People's Coalition totals in the 1983 election.; ^{2} United Left results are compared to Unity for the People of Inca totals in the 1983 election.

=== Llucmajor ===
Population: 15,505

← Summary of the 10 June 1987 City Council of Llucmajor election results →
Parties and alliances	Popular vote			Seats	
Parties and alliances	Votes	%	±pp	Total	+/−
Spanish Socialist Workers' Party (PSOE)	3,159	39.91	−0.25	7	±0
People's Alliance–Liberal Party (AP–PL)^{1}	2,459	31.06	−3.88	6	±0
Majorcan Union (UM)	660	8.34	−13.06	1	−3
People's Democratic Party (PDP)	489	6.18	New	1	+1
Democratic and Social Centre (CDS)	488	6.16	New	1	+1
Socialist Party of Mallorca–Nationalist Left (PSM–EN)	426	5.38	New	1	+1
United Left (EU–IU)^{2}	168	2.12	−1.38	0	±0
Blank ballots	67	0.85	+0.85		
Total	7,916			17	±0
Valid votes	7,916	98.74	−1.26		
Invalid votes	101	1.26	+1.26		
Votes cast / turnout	8,017	68.86	+6.74		
Abstentions	3,622	31.12	−6.74		
Registered voters	11,639				
Sources
Footnotes: ^{1} People's Alliance–Liberal Party results are compared to People's Coalition totals in the 1983 election.; ^{2} United Left results are compared to Communist Party of the Balearic Islands totals in the 1983 election.

=== Manacor ===
Population: 24,345

← Summary of the 10 June 1987 City Council of Manacor election results →
Parties and alliances	Popular vote			Seats	
Parties and alliances	Votes	%	±pp	Total	+/−
People's Alliance–Liberal Party (AP–PL)^{1}	3,831	32.16	−0.16	8	+1
Spanish Socialist Workers' Party (PSOE)	3,240	27.19	+6.65	7	+2
Independent Democratic Candidacy–Socialist Party of Mallorca (CDI–PSM)^{2}	1,340	11.25	−14.33	2	−3
Majorcan Union (UM)	1,283	10.77	−5.77	2	−2
Democratic and Social Centre (CDS)	1,205	10.11	+7.03	2	+2
Independent Manacorí Group (AMI)	402	3.37	New	0	±0
People's Democratic Party (PDP)	251	2.11	New	0	±0
United Left (EU–IU)^{3}	231	1.94	+0.45	0	±0
Blank ballots	131	1.10	+1.10		
Total	11,914			21	±0
Valid votes	11,914	99.18	−0.82		
Invalid votes	98	0.82	+0.82		
Votes cast / turnout	12,012	63.71	+2.47		
Abstentions	6,842	36.29	−2.47		
Registered voters	18,854				
Sources
Footnotes: ^{1} People's Alliance–Liberal Party results are compared to People's Coalition totals in the 1983 election.; ^{2} Independent Democratic Candidacy–Socialist Party of Mallorca results are compared to the combined totals of Independent Democratic Candidacy and Socialist Party of Mallorca–Socialist Party of the Islands in the 1983 election.; ^{3} United Left results are compared to Communist Party of the Balearic Islands totals in the 1983 election.

=== Maó-Mahón ===
Population: 21,627

← Summary of the 10 June 1987 City Council of Maó-Mahón election results →
Parties and alliances	Popular vote			Seats	
Parties and alliances	Votes	%	±pp	Total	+/−
Spanish Socialist Workers' Party (PSOE)	4,090	41.86	−13.00	9	−3
People's Alliance–Liberal Party (AP–PL)^{1}	3,423	35.03	+3.39	8	+1
Agreement of the Left of Menorca (PSM–EU)^{2}	1,189	12.17	−1.34	2	±0
Democratic and Social Centre (CDS)	938	9.60	New	2	+2
Blank ballots	131	1.34	+1.34		
Total	9,771			21	±0
Valid votes	9,771	98.26	−1.74		
Invalid votes	173	1.74	+1.74		
Votes cast / turnout	9,944	61.03	+4.80		
Abstentions	6,349	38.97	−4.80		
Registered voters	16,293				
Sources
Footnotes: ^{1} People's Alliance–Liberal Party results are compared to People's Coalition totals in the 1983 election.; ^{2} Agreement of the Left of Menorca results are compared to the combined totals of Socialist Party of Menorca and Communist Party of the Balearic Islands in the 1983 election.

=== Palma ===
Population: 295,136

← Summary of the 10 June 1987 City Council of Palma election results →
Parties and alliances	Popular vote			Seats	
Parties and alliances	Votes	%	±pp	Total	+/−
Spanish Socialist Workers' Party (PSOE)	51,183	38.45	−7.18	12	−2
People's Alliance–Liberal Party (AP–PL)^{1}	43,493	32.67	−4.02	10	−1
Democratic and Social Centre (CDS)	15,760	11.84	+9.81	3	+3
Majorcan Union (UM)	8,739	6.56	−1.20	2	±0
Socialist Party of Mallorca–Nationalist Left (PSM–EN)	5,526	4.15	+0.14	0	±0
United Left (EU–IU)^{2}	4,777	3.59	+0.45	0	±0
People's Democratic Party (PDP)	896	0.67	New	0	±0
Workers' Party of Spain–Communist Unity (PTE–UC)	745	0.56	New	0	±0
Humanist Platform (PH)	344	0.26	New	0	±0
Blank ballots	1,658	1.25	+1.25		
Total	133,121			27	±0
Valid votes	133,121	98.23	−1.77		
Invalid votes	2,405	1.77	+1.77		
Votes cast / turnout	135,526	61.70	+3.61		
Abstentions	84,141	38.30	−3.61		
Registered voters	219,667				
Sources
Footnotes: ^{1} People's Alliance–Liberal Party results are compared to People's Coalition totals in the 1983 election.; ^{2} United Left results are compared to Communist Party of the Balearic Islands totals in the 1983 election.

=== Santa Eulària des Riu ===
Population: 14,059

← Summary of the 10 June 1987 City Council of Santa Eulària des Riu election results →
Parties and alliances	Popular vote			Seats	
Parties and alliances	Votes	%	±pp	Total	+/−
People's Alliance–Liberal Party (AP–PL)^{1}	4,223	69.00	+1.88	13	+1
Spanish Socialist Workers' Party (PSOE)	1,388	22.68	+0.20	4	±0
Democratic and Social Centre (CDS)	304	4.97	New	0	±0
United Left (EU–IU)	163	2.66	−0.14	0	±0
Liberal Democratic Party (PDL)	n/a	n/a	−7.60	0	−1
Blank ballots	42	0.69	+0.69		
Total	6,120			17	±0
Valid votes	6,120	99.17	−0.83		
Invalid votes	51	0.83	+0.83		
Votes cast / turnout	6,171	62.40	+2.33		
Abstentions	3,718	37.60	−2.33		
Registered voters	9,889				
Sources
Footnotes: ^{1} People's Alliance–Liberal Party results are compared to People's Coalition totals in the 1983 election.; ^{2} United Left results are compared to Communist Party of the Balearic Islands totals in the 1983 election.

== See also ==
- 1987 Balearic regional election
