= 1983 Spanish local elections in the Balearic Islands =

This article presents the results breakdown of the local elections held in the Balearic Islands on 8 May 1983. The following tables show detailed results in the autonomous community's most populous municipalities, sorted alphabetically.

== City control ==
The following table lists party control in the most populous municipalities, including provincial capitals (highlighted in bold). Gains for a party are highlighted in that party's colour.

Municipality	Population	Previous control	New control
Ciutadella de Menorca	17,637	Union of the Democratic Centre (UCD)	Spanish Socialist Workers' Party (PSOE)
Ibiza	25,343	Union of the Democratic Centre (UCD)	People's Coalition (AP–PDP–UL)
Inca	20,747	Union of the Democratic Centre (UCD)	Majorcan Union (UM)
Llucmajor	14,556	Union of the Democratic Centre (UCD)	People's Coalition (AP–PDP–UL)
Mahón	21,860	Union of the Democratic Centre (UCD)	Spanish Socialist Workers' Party (PSOE)
Manacor	24,208	Spanish Socialist Workers' Party (PSOE)	People's Coalition (AP–PDP–UL)
**Palma**	290,372	Spanish Socialist Workers' Party (PSOE)	Spanish Socialist Workers' Party (PSOE)
Santa Eulalia del Río	13,060	People's Coalition (AP–PDP–UL)	People's Coalition (AP–PDP–UL)

== Municipalities ==
=== Ciutadella de Menorca ===
Population: 17,637

← Summary of the 8 May 1983 City Council of Ciutadella de Menorca election results →
Parties and alliances	Popular vote			Seats	
Parties and alliances	Votes	%	±pp	Total	+/−
People's Coalition (AP–PDP–UL)^{1}	2,842	33.30	+26.78	6	+5
Spanish Socialist Workers' Party (PSOE)	2,526	29.60	+21.01	6	+5
Socialist Party of Menorca (PSM)	1,442	16.90	−12.30	3	−2
Independents (INDEP)	1,071	12.55	New	2	+2
Independents (INDEP)	402	4.71	New	0	±0
Democratic and Social Centre (CDS)	251	2.94	New	0	±0
Union of the Democratic Centre (UCD)	n/a	n/a	−42.31	0	−8
Communist Party of the Balearic Islands (PCIB)	n/a	n/a	−13.38	0	−2
Blank ballots	0	0.00	±0.00		
Total	8,534			17	±0
Valid votes	8,534	100.00	+0.58		
Invalid votes	0	0.00	−0.58		
Votes cast / turnout	8,534	65.68	−5.88		
Abstentions	4,459	34.32	+5.88		
Registered voters	12,993				
Sources
Footnotes: ^{1} People's Coalition results are compared to Democratic Coalition totals in the 1979 election.

=== Ibiza ===
Population: 25,343

← Summary of the 8 May 1983 City Council of Ibiza election results →
Parties and alliances	Popular vote			Seats	
Parties and alliances	Votes	%	±pp	Total	+/−
People's Coalition (AP–PDP–UL)^{1}	4,090	43.14	+12.55	10	+4
Spanish Socialist Workers' Party (PSOE)	4,035	42.56	+12.75	10	+3
Liberal Democratic Party (PDL)	713	7.52	New	1	+1
Communist Party of the Balearic Islands (PCIB)	345	3.64	−4.08	0	−1
Independents (INDEP)	297	3.13	New	0	±0
Union of the Democratic Centre (UCD)	n/a	n/a	−30.71	0	−7
Blank ballots	0	0.00	±0.00		
Total	9,480			21	±0
Valid votes	9,480	100.00	+1.58		
Invalid votes	0	0.00	−1.58		
Votes cast / turnout	9,480	50.78	−0.29		
Abstentions	9,188	49.22	+0.29		
Registered voters	18,668				
Sources
Footnotes: ^{1} People's Coalition results are compared to the combined totals of Democratic Coalition and Liberal Party in the 1979 election.

=== Inca ===
Population: 20,747

← Summary of the 8 May 1983 City Council of Inca election results →
Parties and alliances	Popular vote			Seats	
Parties and alliances	Votes	%	±pp	Total	+/−
Majorcan Union (UM)	5,100	49.81	New	12	+12
Spanish Socialist Workers' Party (PSOE)	2,020	19.73	−0.21	4	±0
People's Coalition (AP–PDP–UL)^{1}	1,578	15.41	+3.68	3	+1
Socialist Party of Mallorca–Socialist Party of the Islands (PSM–PSI)^{2}	717	7.00	−16.07	1	−4
Unity for the People of Inca (UPI)^{3}	638	6.23	−5.23	1	−1
Democratic and Social Centre (CDS)	186	1.82	New	0	±0
Union of the Democratic Centre (UCD)	n/a	n/a	−33.41	0	−8
Blank ballots	0	0.00	±0.00		
Total	10,239			21	±0
Valid votes	10,239	100.00	+1.63		
Invalid votes	0	0.00	−1.63		
Votes cast / turnout	10,239	65.39	−0.31		
Abstentions	5,420	34.61	+0.31		
Registered voters	15,659				
Sources
Footnotes: ^{1} People's Coalition results are compared to Democratic Coalition totals in the 1979 election.; ^{2} Socialist Party of Mallorca–Socialist Party of the Islands results are compared to Independent Progressive Candidacy totals in the 1979 election.; ^{3} Unity for the People of Inca results are compared to Communist Party of the Balearic Islands totals in the 1979 election.

=== Llucmajor ===
Population: 14,556

← Summary of the 8 May 1983 City Council of Llucmajor election results →
Parties and alliances	Popular vote			Seats	
Parties and alliances	Votes	%	±pp	Total	+/−
Spanish Socialist Workers' Party (PSOE)	2,825	40.16	+7.29	7	+1
People's Coalition (AP–PDP–UL)	2,458	34.94	New	6	+6
Majorcan Union (UM)	1,505	21.40	New	4	+4
Communist Party of the Balearic Islands (PCE–PCIB)	246	3.50	−1.46	0	±0
Union of the Democratic Centre (UCD)	n/a	n/a	−43.25	0	−8
Independents of Llucmajor (ILL)	n/a	n/a	−10.06	0	−2
Arenal Independent Group (GIA)	n/a	n/a	−8.86	0	−1
Blank ballots	0	0.00	±0.00		
Total	7,034			17	±0
Valid votes	7,034	100.00	+1.42		
Invalid votes	0	0.00	−1.42		
Votes cast / turnout	7,034	62.12	−2.18		
Abstentions	4,289	37.88	+2.18		
Registered voters	11,323				

=== Mahón ===
Population: 21,860

← Summary of the 8 May 1983 City Council of Mahón election results →
Parties and alliances	Popular vote			Seats	
Parties and alliances	Votes	%	±pp	Total	+/−
Spanish Socialist Workers' Party (PSOE)	5,008	54.86	+31.81	12	+7
People's Coalition (AP–PDP–UL)^{1}	2,888	31.64	+23.07	7	+5
Socialist Party of Menorca (PSM)	952	10.43	−6.55	2	−1
Communist Party of the Balearic Islands (PCIB)	281	3.08	−6.66	0	−2
Union of the Democratic Centre (UCD)	n/a	n/a	−38.28	0	−9
Blank ballots	0	0.00	±0.00		
Total	9,129			21	±0
Valid votes	9,129	100.00	+1.31		
Invalid votes	0	0.00	−1.31		
Votes cast / turnout	9,129	56.23	−6.77		
Abstentions	7,106	43.77	+6.77		
Registered voters	16,235				
Sources
Footnotes: ^{1} People's Coalition results are compared to Democratic Coalition totals in the 1979 election.

=== Manacor ===
Population: 24,208

← Summary of the 8 May 1983 City Council of Manacor election results →
Parties and alliances	Popular vote			Seats	
Parties and alliances	Votes	%	±pp	Total	+/−
People's Coalition (AP–PDP–UL)^{1}	3,784	32.77	+21.03	7	+5
Spanish Socialist Workers' Party (PSOE)^{2}	2,371	20.54	−3.51	5	±0
Independent Democratic Candidacy (CDI)	2,339	20.26	+0.34	4	−1
Majorcan Union (UM)^{3}	1,910	16.54	−3.54	4	−1
Socialist Party of Mallorca–Socialist Party of the Islands (PSM–PSI)	614	5.32	New	1	+1
Democratic and Social Centre (CDS)	356	3.08	New	0	±0
Communist Party of the Balearic Islands (PCIB)	172	1.49	−3.39	0	±0
Union of the Democratic Centre (UCD)	n/a	n/a	−19.32	0	−4
Blank ballots	0	0.00	±0.00		
Total	11,546			21	±0
Valid votes	11,546	100.00	+1.16		
Invalid votes	0	0.00	−1.16		
Votes cast / turnout	11,546	61.24	+5.24		
Abstentions	7,307	38.76	−5.24		
Registered voters	18,853				
Sources
Footnotes: ^{1} People's Coalition results are compared to Democratic Coalition totals in the 1979 election.; ^{2} Spanish Socialist Workers' Party results are compared to the combined totals of Spanish Socialist Workers' Party and Independent Option for Manacor in the 1979 election.; ^{3} Majorcan Union results are compared to Autonomous Manacor People totals in the 1979 election.

=== Palma ===
Population: 290,372

← Summary of the 8 May 1983 City Council of Palma election results →
Parties and alliances	Popular vote			Seats	
Parties and alliances	Votes	%	±pp	Total	+/−
Spanish Socialist Workers' Party (PSOE)	56,364	45.63	+10.70	14	+4
People's Coalition (AP–PDP–UL)^{1}	45,330	36.69	+33.81	11	+11
Majorcan Union (UM)	9,588	7.76	New	2	+2
Socialist Party of Mallorca–Socialist Party of the Islands (PSM–PSI)	4,957	4.01	−2.47	0	−2
Communist Party of the Balearic Islands (PCIB)	3,878	3.14	−5.65	0	−2
Democratic and Social Centre (CDS)	2,509	2.03	New	0	±0
Spanish Communist Workers' Party (PCOE)	907	0.73	New	0	±0
Union of the Democratic Centre (UCD)	n/a	n/a	−44.15	0	−13
Blank ballots	0	0.00	±0.00		
Total	123,533			27	±0
Valid votes	123,533	100.00	+2.17		
Invalid votes	0	0.00	−2.17		
Votes cast / turnout	123,533	58.09	+3.89		
Abstentions	89,122	41.91	−3.89		
Registered voters	212,655				
Sources
Footnotes: ^{1} People's Coalition results are compared to Democratic Coalition totals in the 1979 election.

=== Santa Eulalia del Río ===
Population: 13,060

← Summary of the 8 May 1983 City Council of Santa Eulalia del Río election results →
Parties and alliances	Popular vote			Seats	
Parties and alliances	Votes	%	±pp	Total	+/−
People's Coalition (AP–PDP–UL)^{1}	3,667	67.12	+7.87	12	+1
Spanish Socialist Workers' Party (PSOE)	1,228	22.48	+10.17	4	+2
Liberal Democratic Party (PDL)	415	7.60	New	1	+1
Communist Party of the Balearic Islands (PCIB)	153	2.80	−2.21	0	±0
Union of the Democratic Centre (UCD)	n/a	n/a	−23.44	0	−4
Blank ballots	0	0.00	±0.00		
Total	5,463			17	±0
Valid votes	5,463	100.00	+1.61		
Invalid votes	0	0.00	−1.61		
Votes cast / turnout	5,463	60.07	+0.04		
Abstentions	3,632	39.93	−0.04		
Registered voters	9,095				
Sources
Footnotes: ^{1} People's Coalition results are compared to the combined totals of Democratic Coalition and Liberal Party in the 1979 election.

== See also ==
- 1983 Balearic regional election
