= José Gea Escolano =

Spanish Roman Catholic prelate

- Bishop of Mondoñedo-Ferrol
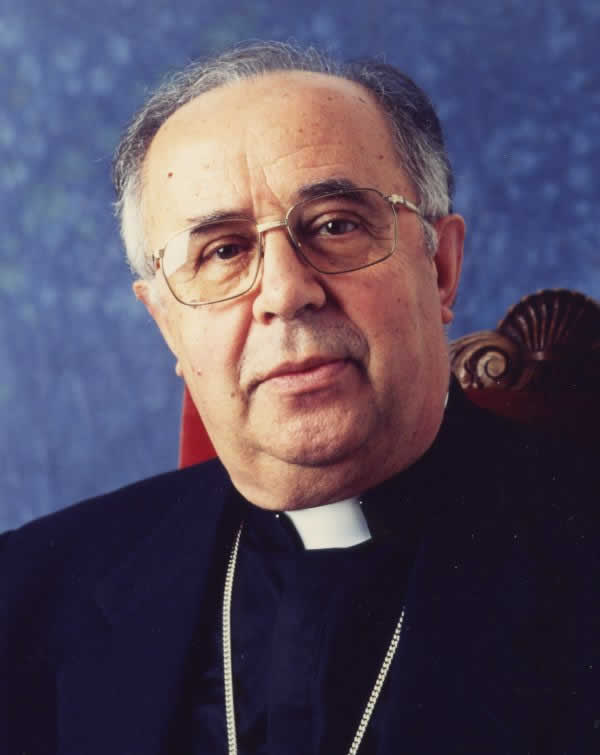
- Church: Catholic Church
- Diocese: Diocese of Mondoñedo-Ferrol
- In office: 15 May 1987 – 6 June 2005
- Predecessor: Miguel Anxo Araúxo Iglesias
- Successor: Manuel Sánchez Monge
- Previous posts: Bishop of Ibiza (1976-1987); Titular Bishop of Arae in Numidia (1971-1976); Auxiliary Bishop of Valencia (1971-1976)

Orders
- Ordination: 29 June 1953
- Consecration: 8 May 1971 by José María García Lahiguera

Personal details
- Born: 14 June 1929 El Real de Gandia, Province of Valencia, Spain
- Died: 6 February 2017 (aged 87) Valencia, Valencian Community, Spain

José Gea Escolano (14 June 1929 – 6 February 2017) was a Spanish Roman Catholic prelate.

Born in El Real de Gandia, Gea Escolano was ordained to the priesthood in 1953. He served as the Bishop of Ibiza from 1976 to 1987, and later as the Bishop of Mondoñedo-Ferrol from 1987 until he retired in 2005. He died on 6 February 2017 in Valencia at the age of 87.
