= Vicente Juan Segura =

Spanish Roman Catholic bishop (1955–2024)

His Excellency Vicente Juan Segura
- Auxiliary Bishop Emeritus of Valencia
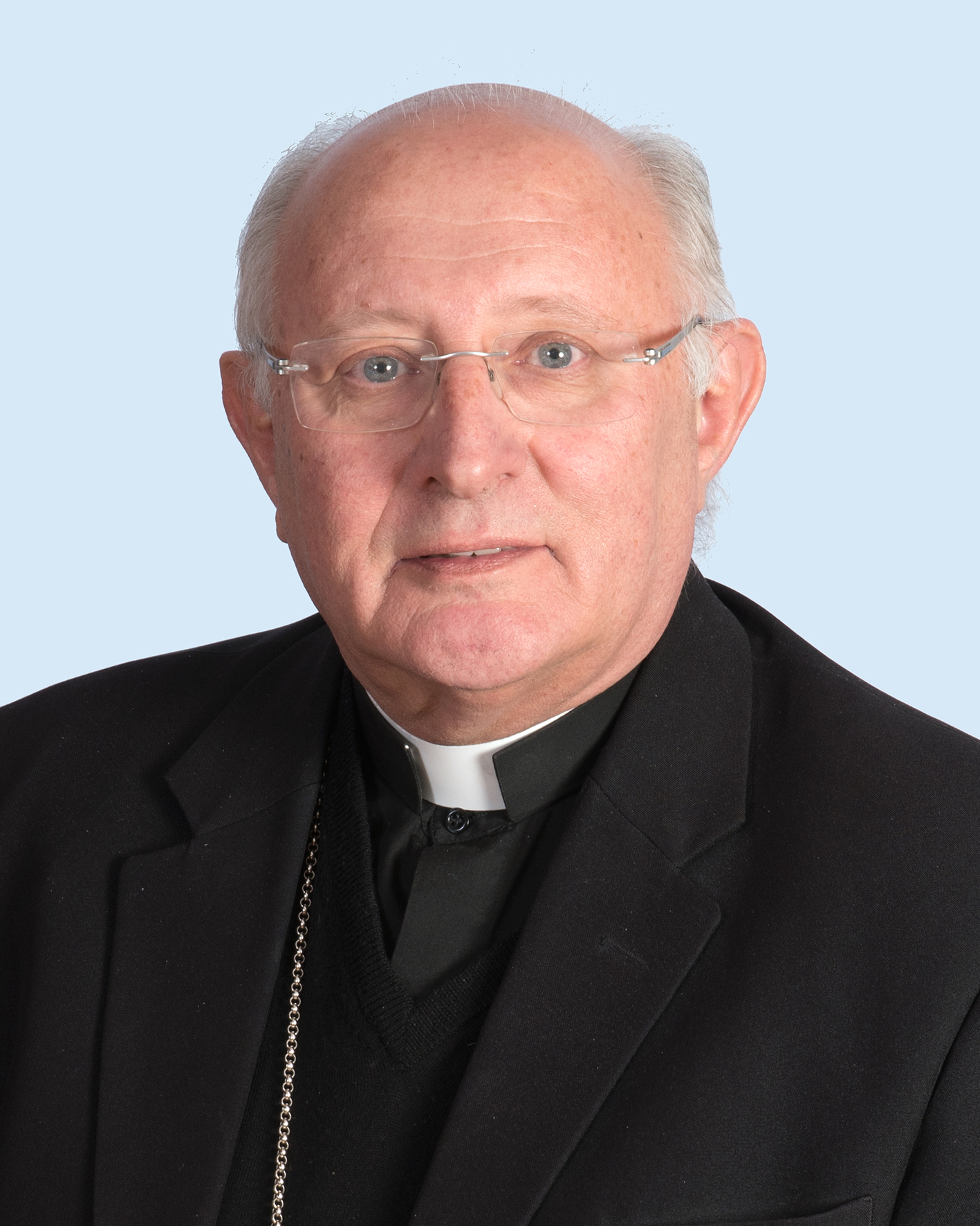
- Archdiocese: Valencia
- Appointed: 18 January 2020
- Term ended: 25 February 2023
- Other post: Titular Bishop of Armentia (2020–2024)
- Previous post: Bishop of Ibiza (2005–2020)

Orders
- Ordination: 24 October 1981
- Consecration: 14 May 2005 by Leonardo Sandri

Personal details
- Born: 22 May 1955 Tavernes de la Valldigna, Spain
- Died: 11 October 2024 (aged 69) Valencia, Spain
- Motto: MIHI VIVERE CHRISTUS EST
- Coat of arms

Styles of Vicente Juan Segura
- Reference style: His Excellency; The Most Reverend
- Spoken style: Your Excellency
- Religious style: Bishop

Vicente Juan Segura (22 May 1955 – 11 October 2024) was a Spanish Roman Catholic prelate who was bishop of Ibiza from his episcopal ordination on 14 May 2005 until 18 January 2020 and auxiliary bishop of Valencia from 18 January 2020 until his resignation on 25 February 2023. Juan Segura was also head of the Spanish section of the Vatican Secretariat of State.

== Biography ==
Juan Segura was born in Tavernes de Valldigna, in the archdiocese of Valencia. He studied law at the Faculty of Civil Law of Valencia. He began training in the ecclesiastical seminary and then in the Real Colegio Seminario y Corpus Christi. He was ordained a priest in his home parish on 24 October 1981.

After having carried out his ministry for four years in the parish of Saint Anthony Abbot, Cullera, he was called to the Pontifical Ecclesiastical Academy, and entered the Holy See's diplomatic service on 1 July 1988. He worked at the Apostolic Nunciatures to Costa Rica, Morocco and Mozambique. In 1994 he became Head of the Spanish section at the Secretariat of State. During his time in Rome he exercised ministry as assistant to the parish of St. Melchiade in Rome and at the Little Sisters of the Abandoned Elderly. On 10 June 2000, he was appointed an Honorary Prelate. He earned a Doctorate in Canon Law at the Pontifical University of Saint Thomas Aquinas, Angelicum and another doctorate in Civil Law at the University of Valencia. In addition to Spanish, he spoke French, Portuguese and Italian.

On 22 January 2005 he was appointed bishop of Ibiza by Pope John Paul II and was ordained on 14 May 2005 by Archbishop Leonardo Sandri with Cardinal Ricardo María Carles Gordó and Archbishop Agustín García-Gasco y Vicente of Valencia as principal co-consecrators.

In September 2007, Juan Segura demanded that a collage of Pope John Paul II in a sexual pose be removed, saying that it “offended Catholic sentiment”, and calling for its “immediate and urgent withdrawal”.

He served as an auxiliary bishop of his native archdiocese of Valencia from 18 January 2020 until 23 February 2023.

Juan Segura died on 11 October 2024, at the age of 69.

Catholic Church titles
Preceded by —	Auxiliary Bishop of Valencia; 2020–2023	Succeeded by —
Preceded by First	Titular Bishop of Armentia; 2020–2024	Succeeded by Vacant
Preceded by Agustín Cortés Soriano	Bishop of Ibiza; 2005–2020	Succeeded by Vicente Ribas Prats
