= Miquel Clar Lladó =

Spanish businessman and politician (1938–2026)

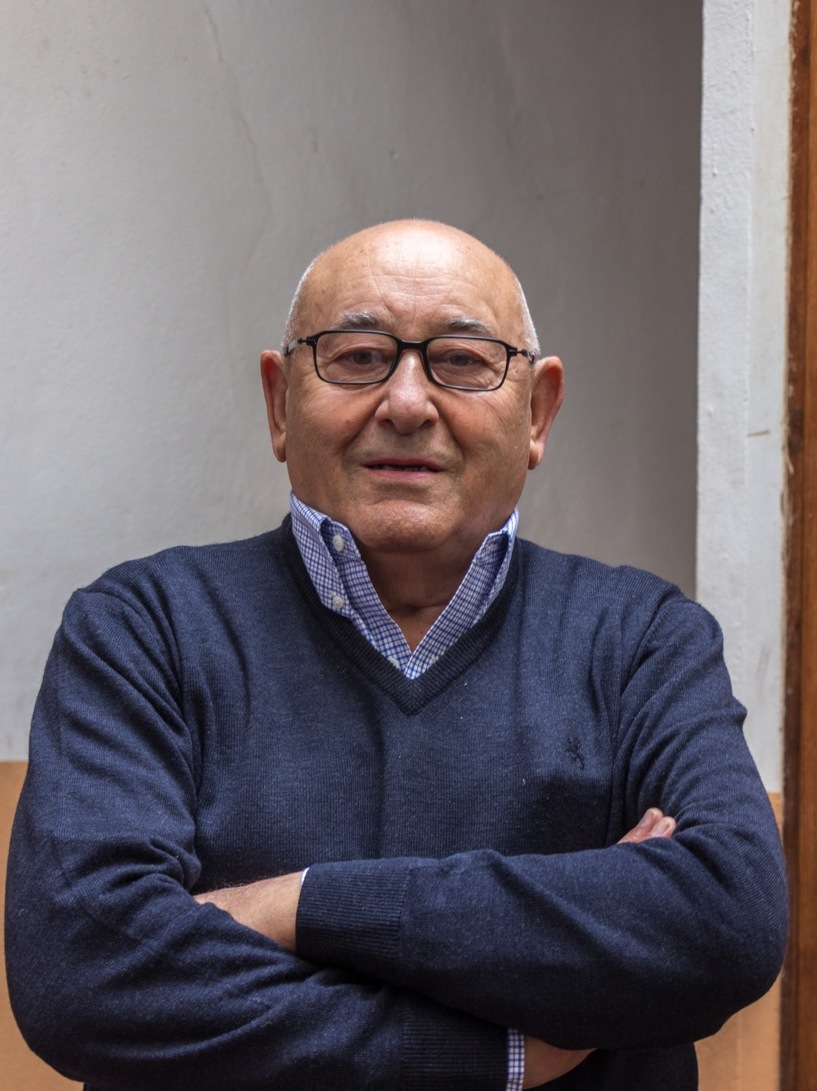
- Lladó in 2015

Member of the Parliament of the Balearic Islands
- In office 14 March 1984 – 14 April 1987
- Preceded by: Elected position created
- Succeeded by: Pedro Pablo Marrero Henning
- Constituency: Mallorca

Mayor of Llucmajor
- In office 3 April 1979 – 8 May 1983
- Preceded by: Gabriel Ramon Julià
- Succeeded by: Antoni Zanoguera Rubí

Personal details
- Born: 12 August 1938 Llucmajor, Mallorca, Spain
- Died: 17 February 2026 (aged 87) Llucmajor, Mallorca, Spain
- Party: Majorcan Union (after 1984)
- Other political affiliations: UCD (before 1983)
- Profession: Businessman

Miquel Clar Lladó (12 August 1938 – 17 February 2026) was a Spanish politician and businessman in Mallorca. In 1979, Clar became the first democratically elected mayor of Llucmajor following the end of Franco dictatorship, serving in that office until 1983. He was then elected to the Parliament of the Balearic Islands from 1984 until 1987 as a member of the former Majorcan Union (UM) party.

== Life and career ==
Clar was born in Llucmajor on 8 December 1938. He spent his early career as an entrepreneur and businessman on his home island of Mallorca. In 1962, Clar opened the first gas station in Llucmajor. Two years later, he began distributing diesel for Balear Oil SL and oil and automotive lubricants for LubriMallorca S.L.

He joined the Union of the Democratic Centre (UCD) in the 1970s during the Spanish transition to democracy following the death of Francisco Franco. He was selected as lead UCD candidate in the 1979 Llucmajor municipal elections and became the first democratically elected Mayor of Llucmajor since the end of the Franco dictatorship. Clar served as mayor from April 1979 until May 1983. During his tenure, Clar oversaw the construction of the town's sports center and retirement home. He also updated Llucmajor's General Urban Development Plan and was seen a proponent of the municipality's development. He served as mayor until 1983 and stepped down from the Llucmajor City Council in 1984 to run for a seat in the Parliament of the Balearic Islands.

Clar ran for the first Parliament of the Balearic Islands in the 1983 Balearic regional election as a member of the Majorcan Union. He was one of six Majorcan Union party candidates in to be elected to the Balearic Islands parliament. He served one term from 1984 until 1987.

Clar Lladó died on 17 February 2026, at the age of 87. His funeral was held at the Sant Miquel de Llucmajor Catholic Church on 18 February.
