= 1979 Spanish local elections in the Balearic Islands =

This article presents the results breakdown of the local elections held in the Balearic Islands on 3 April 1979. The following tables show detailed results in the autonomous community's most populous municipalities, sorted alphabetically.

== City control ==
The following table lists party control in the most populous municipalities, including provincial capitals (highlighted in bold).

Municipality	Population	New control
Ciudadela	17,342	Union of the Democratic Centre (UCD)
Ibiza	22,882	Union of the Democratic Centre (UCD)
Inca	20,032	Independent Progressive Candidacy (CPI) (UCD in 1981)
Lluchmayor	14,307	Union of the Democratic Centre (UCD)
Mahón	21,576	Union of the Democratic Centre (UCD)
Manacor	25,220	Independent Democratic Candidacy (CDI) (PSOE in 1980)
**Palma**	283,113	Spanish Socialist Workers' Party (PSOE)
Santa Eulalia del Río	10,510	Democratic Coalition (CD)

== Municipalities ==
=== Ciudadela ===
Population: 17,342

Summary of the 3 April 1979 City Council of Ciudadela election results →
Parties and alliances	Popular vote			Seats	
Parties and alliances	Votes	%	±pp	Total	+/−
Union of the Democratic Centre (UCD)	3,541	42.31	n/a	8	n/a
Socialist Party of Menorca (PSM)	2,444	29.20	n/a	5	n/a
Communist Party of the Balearic Islands (PCIB)	1,120	13.38	n/a	2	n/a
Spanish Socialist Workers' Party (PSOE)	719	8.59	n/a	1	n/a
Democratic Coalition (CD)	546	6.52	n/a	1	n/a
Blank ballots	0	0.00	n/a		
**Total**	**8,370**			17	**n/a**
Valid votes	8,370	99.42	n/a		
Invalid votes	49	0.58	n/a		
**Votes cast / turnout**	**8,419**	**71.56**	**n/a**		
Abstentions	3,346	28.44	n/a		
**Registered voters**	**11,765**				

=== Ibiza ===
Population: 22,882

Summary of the 3 April 1979 City Council of Ibiza election results →
Parties and alliances	Popular vote			Seats	
Parties and alliances	Votes	%	±pp	Total	+/−
Union of the Democratic Centre (UCD)	2,346	30.71	n/a	**7**	n/a
Spanish Socialist Workers' Party (PSOE)	2,277	29.81	n/a	**7**	n/a
Democratic Coalition (CD)	2,019	26.43	n/a	**6**	n/a
Communist Party of the Balearic Islands (PCE–PCIB)	590	7.72	n/a	**1**	n/a
Liberal Party (PL)	318	4.16	n/a	0	n/a
Party of Labour of the Islands (PTI)	69	0.90	n/a	0	n/a
Blank ballots	0	0.00	n/a		
**Total**	**7,639**			**21**	**n/a**
Valid votes	7,639	98.42	n/a		
Invalid votes	123	1.58	n/a		
**Votes cast / turnout**	**7,762**	**51.07**	**n/a**		
Abstentions	7,438	48.93	n/a		
**Registered voters**	**15,200**				

=== Inca ===
Population: 20,032

Summary of the 3 April 1979 City Council of Inca election results →
Parties and alliances	Popular vote			Seats	
Parties and alliances	Votes	%	±pp	Total	+/−
Union of the Democratic Centre (UCD)	3,090	33.41	n/a	**8**	n/a
Independent Progressive Candidacy (CPI)	2,134	23.07	n/a	**5**	n/a
Spanish Socialist Workers' Party (PSOE)	1,844	19.94	n/a	**4**	n/a
Democratic Coalition (CD)	1,085	11.73	n/a	**2**	n/a
Communist Party of the Balearic Islands (PCIB)	1,060	11.46	n/a	**2**	n/a
Workers' Revolutionary Organization (ORT)	37	0.40	n/a	0	n/a
Blank ballots	0	0.00	n/a		
**Total**	**9,250**			**21**	**n/a**
Valid votes	9,250	98.37	n/a		
Invalid votes	153	1.63	n/a		
**Votes cast / turnout**	**9,403**	**65.70**	**n/a**		
Abstentions	4,908	34.30	n/a		
**Registered voters**	**14,311**				

=== Lluchmayor ===
Population: 14,307

Summary of the 3 April 1979 City Council of Lluchmayor election results →
Parties and alliances	Popular vote			Seats	
Parties and alliances	Votes	%	±pp	Total	+/−
Union of the Democratic Centre (UCD)	2,945	43.25	n/a	**8**	n/a
Spanish Socialist Workers' Party (PSOE)	2,238	32.87	n/a	**6**	n/a
Independents of Llucmajor (ILL)	685	10.06	n/a	**2**	n/a
Arenal Independent Group (GIA)	603	8.86	n/a	**1**	n/a
Communist Party of the Balearic Islands (PCE–PCIB)	338	4.96	n/a	0	n/a
Blank ballots	0	0.00	n/a		
**Total**	**6,809**			**17**	**n/a**
Valid votes	6,809	98.58	n/a		
Invalid votes	98	1.42	n/a		
**Votes cast / turnout**	**6,907**	**64.30**	**n/a**		
Abstentions	3,835	35.70	n/a		
**Registered voters**	**10,742**				

=== Mahón ===
Population: 21,576

Summary of the 3 April 1979 City Council of Mahón election results →
Parties and alliances	Popular vote			Seats	
Parties and alliances	Votes	%	±pp	Total	+/−
Union of the Democratic Centre (UCD)	3,609	38.28	n/a	**9**	n/a
Spanish Socialist Workers' Party (PSOE)	2,173	23.05	n/a	**5**	n/a
Socialist Party of Menorca (PSM)	1,601	16.98	n/a	**3**	n/a
Communist Party of the Balearic Islands (PCIB)	918	9.74	n/a	**2**	n/a
Democratic Coalition (CD)	808	8.57	n/a	**2**	n/a
Party of Labour of the Islands (PTI)	319	3.38	n/a	0	n/a
Blank ballots	0	0.00	n/a		
**Total**	**9,428**			**21**	**n/a**
Valid votes	9,428	98.69	n/a		
Invalid votes	125	1.31	n/a		
**Votes cast / turnout**	**9,553**	**63.00**	**n/a**		
Abstentions	5,610	37.00	n/a		
**Registered voters**	**15,163**				

=== Manacor ===
Population: 25,220

Summary of the 3 April 1979 City Council of Manacor election results →
Parties and alliances	Popular vote			Seats	
Parties and alliances	Votes	%	±pp	Total	+/−
Autonomous Manacor People (MA)	2,136	20.08	n/a	**5**	n/a
Independent Democratic Candidacy (CDI)	2,119	19.92	n/a	**5**	n/a
Union of the Democratic Centre (UCD)	2,055	19.32	n/a	**4**	n/a
Independent Option for Manacor (OIM)	1,450	13.63	n/a	**3**	n/a
Democratic Coalition (CD)	1,249	11.74	n/a	**2**	n/a
Spanish Socialist Workers' Party (PSOE)	1,108	10.42	n/a	**2**	n/a
Communist Party of the Balearic Islands (PCE–PCIB)	519	4.88	n/a	0	n/a
Blank ballots	0	0.00	n/a		
**Total**	**10,636**			**21**	**n/a**
Valid votes	10,636	98.84	n/a		
Invalid votes	125	1.16	n/a		
**Votes cast / turnout**	**10,761**	**56.00**	**n/a**		
Abstentions	8,455	44.00	n/a		
**Registered voters**	**19,216**				

=== Palma ===
Population: 283,113

Summary of the 3 April 1979 City Council of Palma election results →
Parties and alliances	Popular vote			Seats	
Parties and alliances	Votes	%	±pp	Total	+/−
Union of the Democratic Centre (UCD)	46,530	44.15	n/a	**13**	n/a
Spanish Socialist Workers' Party (PSOE)	36,810	34.93	n/a	**10**	n/a
Communist Party of the Balearic Islands (PCIB)	9,258	8.79	n/a	**2**	n/a
Socialist Party of Mallorca (PSM)	6,832	6.48	n/a	**2**	n/a
Democratic Coalition (CD)	3,033	2.88	n/a	0	n/a
José Antonio Circles (CJA)	1,019	0.97	n/a	0	n/a
Communist Movement–Organization of Communist Left (MCI–OEC)	751	0.71	n/a	0	n/a
Party of Labour of the Islands (PTI–PTE)	681	0.65	n/a	0	n/a
Carlist Party (PC)	466	0.44	n/a	0	n/a
Blank ballots	0	0.00	n/a		
**Total**	**105,380**			**27**	**n/a**
Valid votes	105,380	97.83	n/a		
Invalid votes	2,334	2.17	n/a		
**Votes cast / turnout**	**107,714**	**54.20**	**n/a**		
Abstentions	91,005	45.80	n/a		
**Registered voters**	**198,719**				

=== Santa Eulalia del Río ===
Population: 10,510

Summary of the 3 April 1979 City Council of Santa Eulalia del Río election results →
Parties and alliances	Popular vote			Seats	
Parties and alliances	Votes	%	±pp	Total	+/−
Democratic Coalition (CD)	2,362	53.54	n/a	**10**	n/a
Union of the Democratic Centre (UCD)	1,034	23.44	n/a	**4**	n/a
Spanish Socialist Workers' Party (PSOE)	543	12.31	n/a	**2**	n/a
Liberal Party (PL)	252	5.71	n/a	**1**	n/a
Communist Party of the Balearic Islands (PCE–PCIB)	221	5.01	n/a	0	n/a
Blank ballots	0	0.00	n/a		
**Total**	**4,412**			**17**	**n/a**
Valid votes	4,412	98.39	n/a		
Invalid votes	72	1.61	n/a		
**Votes cast / turnout**	**4,484**	**60.03**	**n/a**		
Abstentions	2,985	39.97	n/a		
**Registered voters**	**7,469**				
