= Francisco Fabián y Fuero =

Spanish Roman Catholic bishop

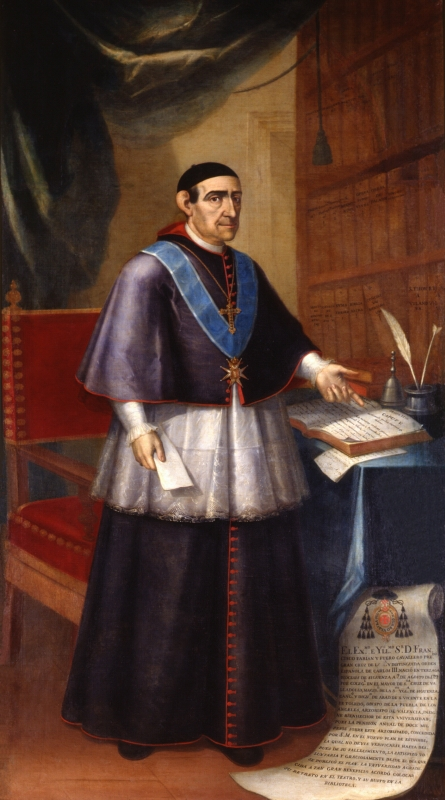
Portrait of Francisco Fabián y Fuero, by Juan Bautista Suñer, University of Valencia

Francisco Fabián y Fuero (7 August 1719, in Terzaga, Aragon – 3 August 1801, in Torrehermosa) was a Spanish Roman Catholic bishop.

== Biography ==
He studied in Calatayud and Alcalá, and was at different times rector of the colleges of San Antonio de Siguenza and Santa Cruz, in Valladolid. He was appointed bishop of Puebla, Mexico, in 1764, and was present at the fourth Mexican provincial synod in 1771. He resigned his bishopric in 1773. On his return to Spain, he was promoted archbishop of Valencia, and retired in 1795 to the place of his birth.

At Puebla he introduced many improvements; founded in the seminary of that city several chairs of learning, organized an academy of literature, and founded a library, which he enriched with select works and a printing press. He reorganized the discipline of the convents, and established a college to educate Indian youths. Fuero left many interesting manuscripts, and published a volume on scientific subjects (1772).

== External links and additional sources ==
- Cheney, David M. "Archdiocese of Valencia". Catholic-Hierarchy.org. (for Chronology of Bishops)^{self-published}
- Chow, Gabriel. "Metropolitan Archdiocese of Valencia". GCatholic.org. (for Chronology of Bishops)^{self-published}
- Wilson, J. G.; Fiske, J., eds. (1900). "Fuero, Francisco Fabian" . Appletons' Cyclopædia of American Biography. New York: D. Appleton.
