= Antonio Cañizares Llovera =

Spanish cardinal (born 1945)

His Eminence Antonio Cañizares Llovera
- Cardinal, Archbishop Emeritus of Valencia
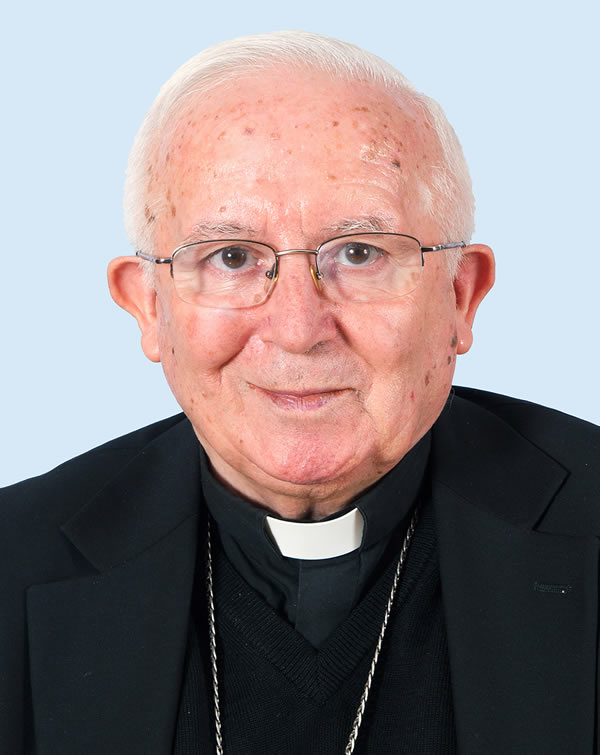
- Cañizares in 2016
- Church: Roman Catholic Church
- Archdiocese: Valencia
- Appointed: 28 August 2014
- Installed: 4 October 2014
- Term ended: 10 October 2022
- Predecessor: Carlos Osoro Sierra
- Successor: Enrique Benavent Vidal
- Other post: Cardinal-Priest of S. Pancrazio
- Previous posts: Bishop of Avila (1992–1996); Archbishop of Granada (1996–2002); Archbishop of Toledo (2002–2008); Prefect of the Congregation for Divine Worship and the Discipline of the Sacraments (2008–14)

Orders
- Ordination: 21 June 1970 by José María García Lahiguera
- Consecration: 25 April 1992 by Mario Tagliaferri
- Created cardinal: 24 March 2006 by Pope Benedict XVI
- Rank: Cardinal Priest

Personal details
- Born: Antonio Cañizares Llovera; 15 October 1945 (age 81) Utiel, Spain
- Denomination: Roman Catholic
- Education: Pontifical University of Salamanca
- Motto: Fiat voluntas tua ("Thy will be done")
- Coat of arms

Antonio Cañizares Llovera (Spanish pronunciation: [anˈto.njo kaɲiˈθaɾes ʎoˈβeɾa]; born 15 October 1945) is a Spanish Catholic cardinal who served as Archbishop of Valencia from 2014 to 2022. He was prefect of the Congregation for Divine Worship and the Discipline of the Sacraments from 2008 to 2014, Archbishop of Toledo and Primate of Spain from 2002 to 2008, and Archbishop of Granada from 1996 to 2002. He was made a cardinal in 2006.

== Early life ==
Antonio Cañizares was born on 15 October 1945 in Utiel. His family moved to Sinarcas and he attended school there and in Requena. He earned a bachelor's degree in philosophy at the seminary in Valencia in 1964. At the Pontifical University of Salamanca, he obtained his licentiate in theology in 1968 and his doctorate in theology in 1971. He was ordained a priest on 21 June 1970 by Archbishop José García Lahiguera. He undertook his first parish work in October 1972 at Santa María in Alcoy and there also served as a university chaplain, founded and ran schools for catechists.

After a few years he moved to the Archdiocese of Madrid. He was professor of the at the Pontifical University of Salamanca from 1972 to 1992; professor of fundamental theology at the Conciliar Seminary of Madrid from 1974 to 1992, and professor at the Higher Institute of Religious Sciences and Catechesis beginning in 1975, where he also served as director from 1978 to 1986. From 1985 to 1992, Cañizares served as director of the CEE's Commission for the Doctrine of the Faith. He also founded and was the first president of Asociación Española de Catequistas, and was director of the review Teología y Catequesis.

== Early episcopal career ==
Styles of Antonio Cañizares Llovera
- Reference style: His Eminence
- Spoken style: Your Eminence
- Informal style: Cardinal
- See: Valencia

On 6 March 1992, Cañizares was appointed Bishop of Ávila by Pope John Paul II. He received his episcopal consecration on the following 25 April from Archbishop Mario Tagliaferri, with Cardinals Ángel Suquía Goicoechea and Marcelo González Martín serving as co-consecrators, in the Cathedral of Ávila. Cañizares was named a member of the Congregation for the Doctrine of the Faith on 10 November 1995.

He was named Archbishop of Granada on 10 December 1996. He took possession of the see on 1 February 1997. He was also Apostolic Administrator of Cartagena from January to October 1998. He was president of the CEE's Commission of Education and Catechesis in 1999 to 2005.

Cañizares was promoted to Archbishop of Toledo and Primate of Spain on 24 October 2002 by Pope John Paul II. He took possession of the see on 15 December. In 2005 he was elected to a three-year term as vice-president of the CEE. Pope Benedict XVI made him a cardinal on 24 March 2006, assigning him the rank of cardinal priest with the title of San Pancrazio. On 8 April 2006, Benedict made him a member of the Pontifical Commission Ecclesia Dei, his first assignment related to the liturgy issues that became his focus in later years. He was awarded an honorary doctorate by the Universidad CEU Cardenal Herrera on 4 July 2007.

Cañizares was elected to medalla nº 16 of the Real Academia de la Historia on 1 December 2006 and he took up his seat on 24 February 2008. Cañizares was sometimes called "Little Ratzinger" because his views mirrored those of Pope Benedict XVI, born Joseph Ratzinger, a nickname Pope Benedict found amusing.

== Prefect of the Congregation for Divine Worship ==
On 9 December 2008, Pope Benedict appointed him Prefect of the Congregation for Divine Worship and the Discipline of the Sacraments. Benedict made him a member of the Congregation for Bishops on 17 October 2009.

In 2009, after a report detailed extensive sexual abuse on the part of Irish priests and as the Spanish government proposed easing restrictions on abortion, he said child abuse on the part of Catholic priests "cannot be compared with the millions of lives that have been destroyed by abortion. It has legally destroyed 40 million human lives."

On 4 March 2010, he was appointed a member of the Pontifical Committee for International Eucharistic Congresses. On 13 November 2010 he was made a member of the Congregation for the Causes of Saints. On 5 March 2012 he was appointed a member of the Congregation for the Evangelization of Peoples.

In 2013, discussing the importance Vatican II gave to liturgy, he said its "renewal must be understood in continuity with the Tradition of the Church and not as a break or discontinuity", eschewing both innovations that do not respect tradition and a rigidity that allows no change to the liturgy that Pope Pius XII knew.

He was one of the cardinal electors who participated in the 2013 papal conclave that selected Pope Francis.

== Archbishop of Valencia ==
On 28 August 2014, Pope Francis appointed Cañizares Archbishop of Valencia. Cañizares reportedly asked Francis to name him to a Spanish see. He was installed there on 4 October. In this role he again adopted a combative tone, objecting to the secularism he said the government promoted and condemning the influence of "the gay empire". In 2015, he questioned the good faith of immigrants to Spain and said very few were fleeing persecution. Faced with a storm of protest and charges of racism, he reversed his position, modified his language, and developed initiatives to welcome refugees and was recognized by Pope Francis for his efforts.

He served as vice president of the CEE again from 2017 to 2020.

Pope Francis accepted his resignation as archbishop of Valencia on 10 October 2022.

== Health ==
Cañizares was one of two eligible cardinal electors who did not attend the 2025 papal conclave to elect a successor to Pope Francis, for health reasons.

He was hospitalized on 7 August 2025, and the state of his health was described as "delicate".

Catholic Church titles
Preceded by Felipe Fernández García	Bishop of Ávila; 6 March 1992 – 10 December 1996	Succeeded by Adolfo González Montes
Preceded by José Méndez Asensio	Archbishop of Granada; 10 December 1996 – 24 October 2002	Succeeded by Francisco Martínez Fernández
Preceded by Francisco Álvarez Martínez	Archbishop of Toledo; 24 October 2002 – 9 December 2008	Succeeded by Braulio Rodríguez Plaza
Preceded by José Lebrún Moratinos	Cardinal-Priest of San Pancrazio; 24 March 2006	Incumbent
Preceded by Francis Arinze	Prefect of the Congregation for Divine Worship and the Discipline of the Sacraments; 9 December 2008 – 23 November 2014	Succeeded by Robert Sarah
Preceded by Carlos Osoro Sierra	Archbishop of Valencia; 4 October 2014 – 10 October 2022	Succeeded by Enrique Benavent Vidal
