= Ibiza Cathedral =

Roman catholic cathedral in Spain

- Cathedral of the Virgin of the Snows
- Catedral de Virgen de las Nieves; Catedral de la Verge de les Neus
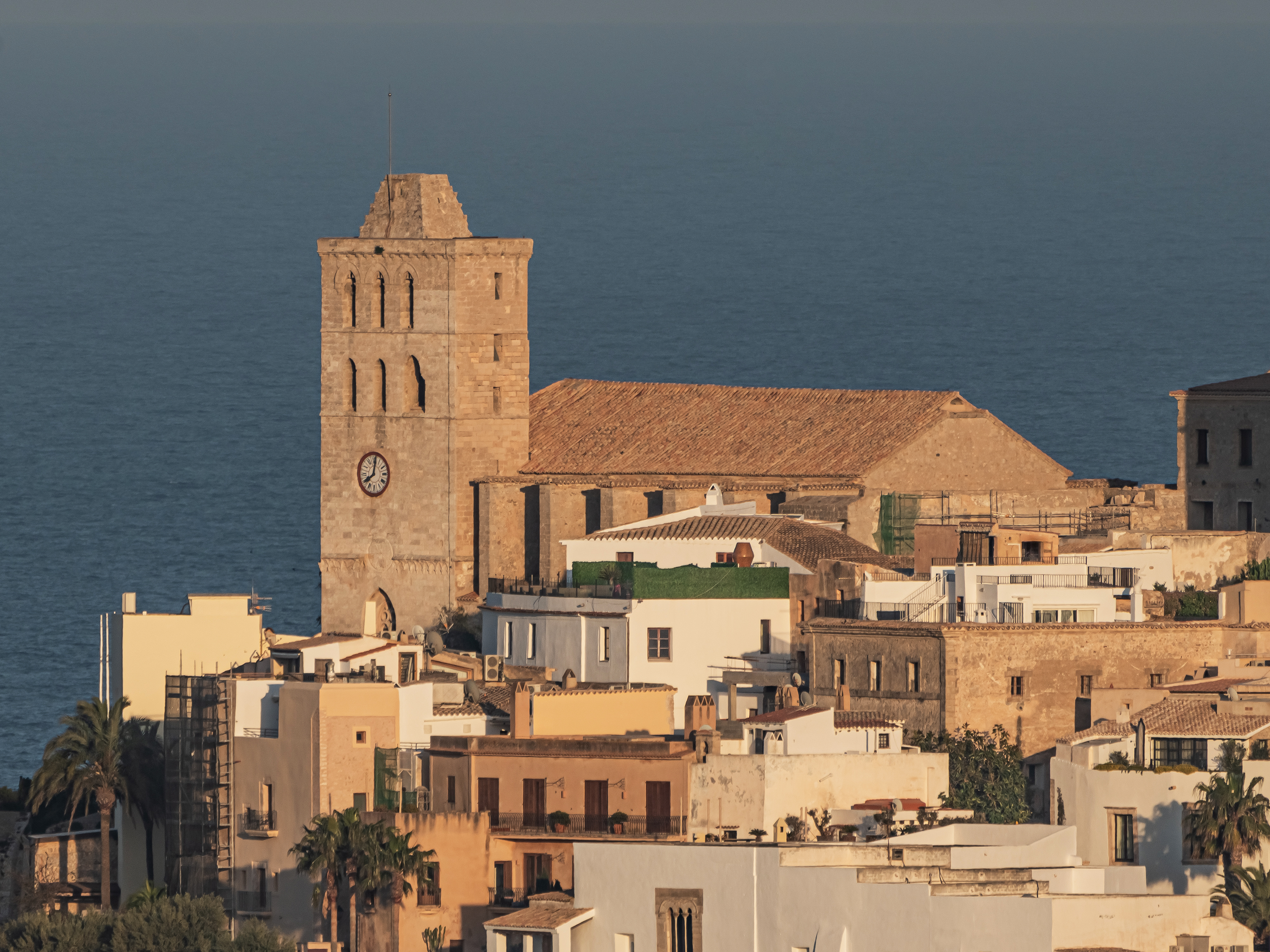
- North façade and bell tower
- Ibiza Cathedral
- 38°54′24″N 1°26′12″E
- Location: Ibiza
- Address: Plaça de la Catedral
- Country: Spain
- Denomination: Catholic

History
- Status: Cathedral
- Dedication: Saint Mary of the Snows
- Dedicated: 31 January 1817

Architecture
- Style: Gothic, Baroque
- Years built: 14th—18th Century

Specifications
- Length: 38.5 m (126 ft)
- Width: 12.85 m (42.2 ft)
- Height: 18 m (59 ft)

Administration
- Metropolis: Valencia
- Diocese: Ibiza

Clergy
- Bishop: Vicente Ribas Prats

UNESCO World Heritage Site
- Criteria: Cultural and Natural: (ii)(iii)(iv)(ix)(x)
- Designated: 1999 (23rd session)
- Part of: Ibiza, Biodiversity and Culture
- Reference no.: 417rev

Spanish Cultural Heritage
- Type: Non-movable
- Criteria: Monument
- Designated: 3 June 1931
- Reference no.: RI-51-0010949

The Cathedral of the Virgin of the Snows (Catalan: Catedral de la Verge de les Neus, Spanish: Catedral de Nuestra Señora de las Nieves) is a Roman Catholic cathedral in the city of Ibiza, Spain. Located in the Dalt Vila, the historic centre of the city, it is the seat of the Roman Catholic Diocese of Ibiza since 1817.

== History ==
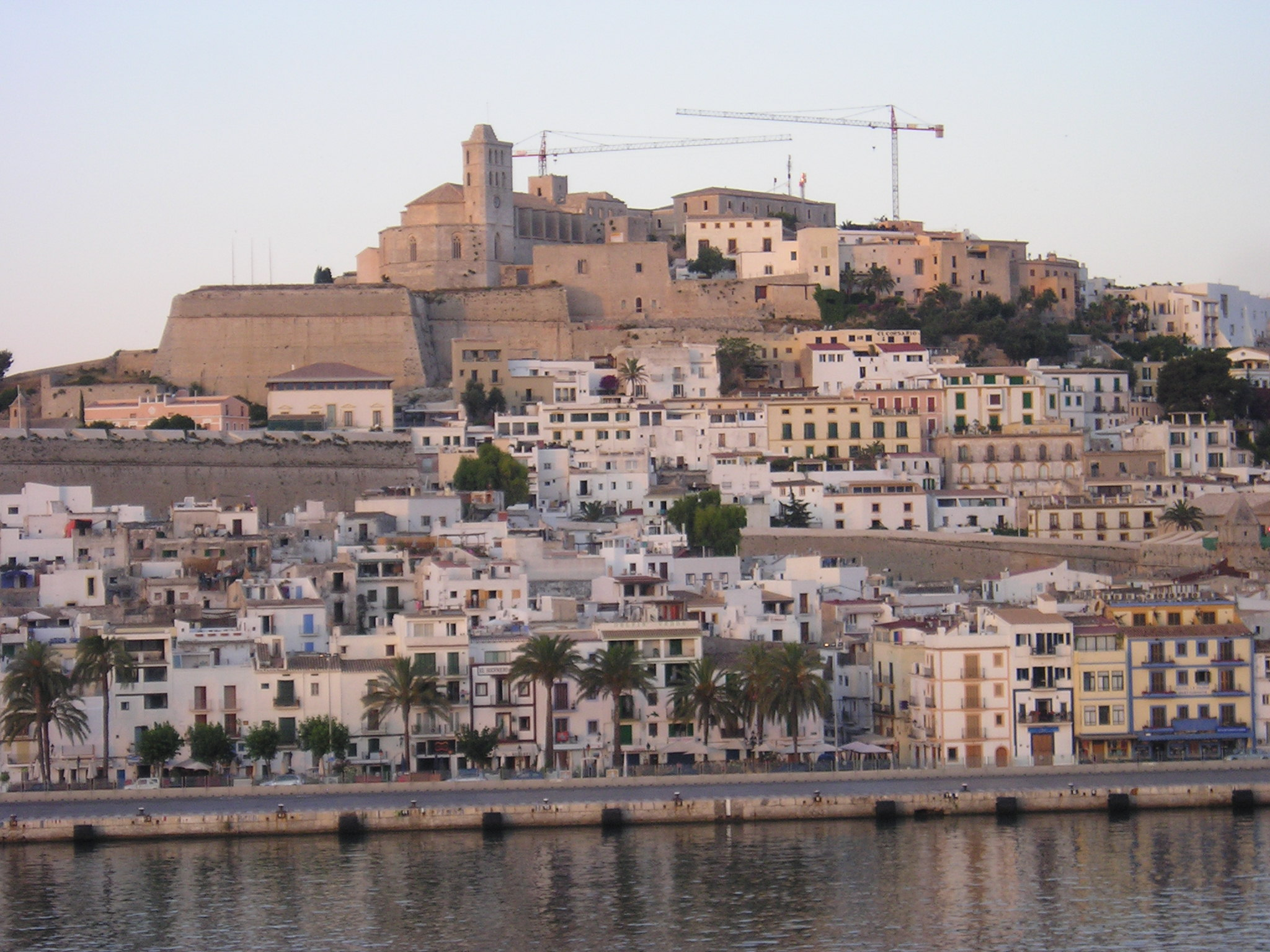
Ibiza Old Town with Cathedral

In 1234, the future conquerors of the island, Guillermo de Montgrí, Peter of Portugal and Nuno Sanç, signed an agreement stipulating that establishing a parish dedicated to Saint Mary would be one of their first obligations upon conquest. As a result, the parish was established once Ibiza was taken on August 8, 1235.

The existing structure is the result of numerous changes to the original building, including additions to the east side that include a trapezoidal bell tower and a polygonal apse with its five chapels. It is a very solid building, built in the Catalan Gothic style in the 16th century.

In 1435, the church had five chapels, dedicated to Saint James and Saint Michael, to Saint Tecla and Saint Anthony, to Saint John Baptist and Saint John Evangelist and to Saint Peter and Saint Paul. A new nave was built at the end of the 15th century, finished off with the Fonda chapel made by the Francolins in 1538.

In the 18th century, the church was heavily refurbished, as a result of the bad condition of the structure. The works were directed by Jaume Espinosa and Pere Ferro, who were the obrers de la vila (Town Builders). The renovations took place between 1715 and 1728. In 1782, Pope Pius VI established the episcopal see of Ibiza and the medieval church, renovated, became the cathedral in 1817. The Diocese was eliminated between 1851 and 1949 for financial reasons. It has since been suffragan of the Archdiocese of Valencia.

Today, the cathedral keeps many works of art, among which are several notable pieces: a Gothic monstrance of golden silver, made by Francesc Martí in 1399, two Gothic panels of Saint Tecla and Saint Anthony, painted by Francesc Cornes in the 14th century, and another two—from the 15th century—by the master Valentí Montoliu that represent Saint James and Saint Matthew.
