= Arnau of Peralta =

Spanish bishop

Arnau of Peralta (died 1271) was the Bishop of Valencia from 1243 until 1248 and Bishop of Zaragoza from then on until his death.

Of Aragonese origin, Arnau was appointed Bishop of Valencia in 1243. He served in that position until 1248. Peralta entered into military disputes with Bishop Pedro Graces, Bishop of Segovia, over which of them should possess that city. Despite the Bishop of Segovia's title, Segovia had been for centuries under the rule of the Moors and no Christian bishop had held clear control over the Christians who lived in that city.

Arnau's term as bishop in Valencia ended in 1248. He was at that point made Bishop of Zaragoza and served in this latter position until his death in 1271.

== Sources ==
- https://www.newadvent.org/cathen/15251b.htm
- http://www.catholic-hierarchy.org/bishop/bperaa.html
