= Diocese of Ibiza =

Diocese of the Catholic Church in Spain

Coordinates: 38°52′N 1°26′E

Diocese of Ibiza Dioecesis Ebusitanus Diócesis de Ibiza (es) Diòcesi d'Eivissa (ca)

Catholic
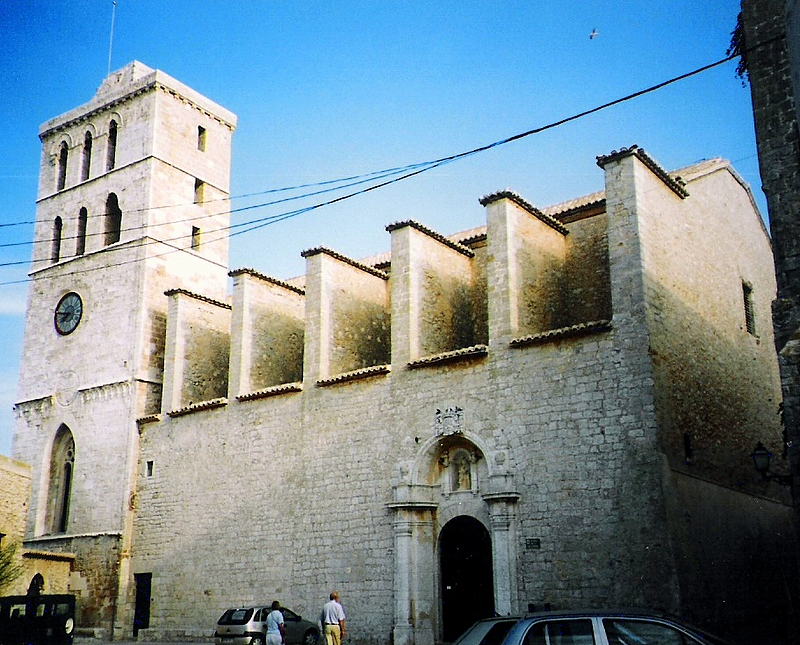
- Ibiza Cathedral

Location
- Country: Spain
- Ecclesiastical province: Valencia
- Metropolitan: Valencia

Statistics
- Area: 872 km^{2} (337 sq mi)
- Population: Total; Catholics: (as of 2006); 118,013; 110,000 (93.2%)

Information
- Denomination: Roman Catholic
- Rite: Latin Rite
- Cathedral: Cathedral of St Mary in Ibiza

Current leadership
- Pope: Leo XIV
- Bishop: Vicente Ribas i Prats
- Metropolitan Archbishop: Enrique Benavent Vidal

Map
- The Diocese of Ibiza in blue.

Website
- Ibiza diocesan website

The Diocese of Ibiza (Latin: Dioecesis Ebusitanus) is a diocese of the Catholic Church comprising Ibiza and Formentera situated in the Balearic Islands and located in the ecclesiastical province of Valencia, Spain.

== History ==
In the early medieval period, Ibiza was under the control of the muslim Al-Andalus. On 8 August 1235, Ibiza was conquered for Christianity by Guillermo de Montgrí, the Archbishop-elect of Tarragona. As a result of a promise made prior to the invasion, a parish dedicated to the Virgin Mary was established under the Archdiocese of Tarragona as the only parish on the island. On 30 April 1782 Pope Pius VI issued a papal bull that established as Diocese of Ibiza under the Metropolitan Archdiocese of Tarragona.

In 1851, following a concordat between the Kingdom of Spain and the Holy See, the diocese was suppressed and intended to fall under the Diocese of Majorca. However due to local dissent, the full integration into Majorca was never carried out. The Catholic Church in Ibiza was then run by ecclesiastic governors appointed by the Archbishop of Tarragona. In 1927, following requests from Ibizans and Formenterians as well as the Bishop of Majorca and the chaplain to the Queen of Spain, the Pope restored the Diocese of Ibiza's autonomy with the creation of the Apostolic Administration of Ibiza and in 1949, the Diocese of Ibiza was formally re-established suo jure by Pope Pius XII and placed under the Archdiocese of Valencia.

== Leadership ==
Bishops of Ibiza (Latin Rite):

- Manuel Abad y Lasierra (18 Jul 1783 – 28 Sep 1787)
- Eustaquio de Azara y Pereda, O.S.B. (7 Apr 1788 – 12 Sep 1794)
- Blas Jacobo Beltrán (26 Jun 1805 – 10 Jul 1815)
- Felipe González y Abarca, O. de M. (22 Jul 1816 – 30 Aug 1829)
- Basilio Antonio Carrasco y Hernando, O. de M. (26 Mar 1831 – 4 Apr 1852)
  - See vacant (1852–1927)
- Salvio Huix i Miralpeix, Titular Bishop of Selymbria and Apostolic Administrator (1928–35), translated Bishop of Lerida, later beatified 2013
- Antonio Cardona Riera, Apostolic Administrator (21 Jun 1935 – 2 Feb 1950), then Bishop (2 Feb 1950 – 28 Mar 1960)
- Francisco Planas Muntaner (28 Mar 1960 – 10 Sep 1976)
- José Gea Escolano (10 Sep 1976 – 15 May 1987)
- Manuel Ureña Pastor (8 Jul 1988 – 23 Jul 1991)
- Javier Salinas y Viñals (26 May 1992 – 5 Sep 1997)
- Agustín Cortés Soriano (20 Feb 1998 – 15 Jun 2004)
- Vicente Juan Segura (22 Jan 2005 – 18 Jan 2020), translated Auxiliary Bishop of Valencia
- Vicente Ribas i Prats (13 Oct 2021 – present)

== See also ==
- Balearic Islands
- Roman Catholicism in Spain

== Extra sources ==
- Catholic Hierarchy
- Diocese of Ibiza website

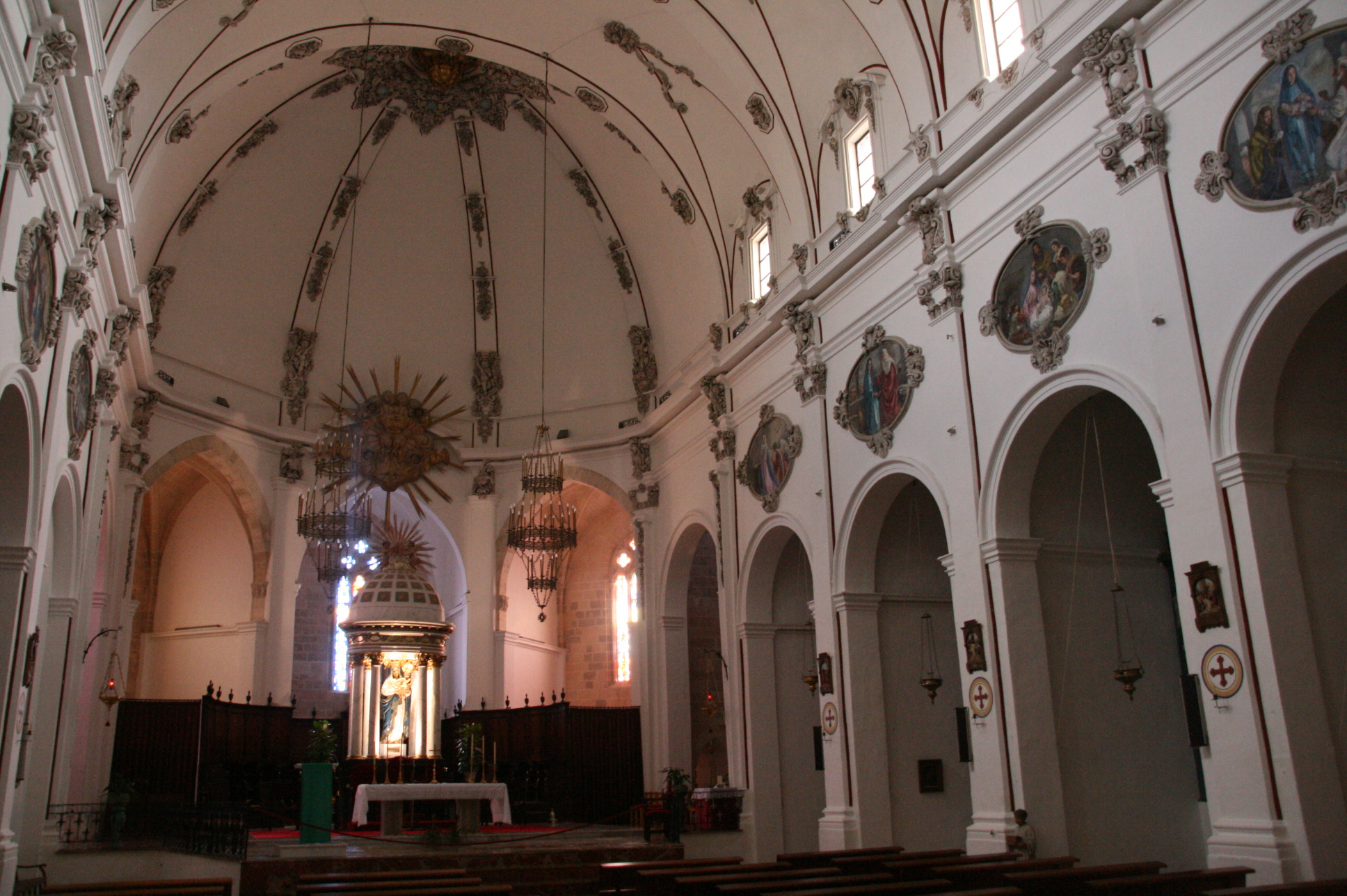
Altar of St Mary's Cathedral, Ibiza
