= Blas Jacobo Beltrán =

Roman-catholic bishop

Blas Jacobo Beltrán (born 22 July 1746 in Luesma) was a Spanish clergyman and bishop for the Roman Catholic Diocese of Ibiza, and later Roman Catholic Diocese of Coria. He was appointed bishop in 1805. He died in 1821.
