= Enrique Benavent Vidal =

Spanish prelate of the Catholic Church (born 1959)

The Most Reverend Enrique Benavent Vidal
- Archbishop of Valencia
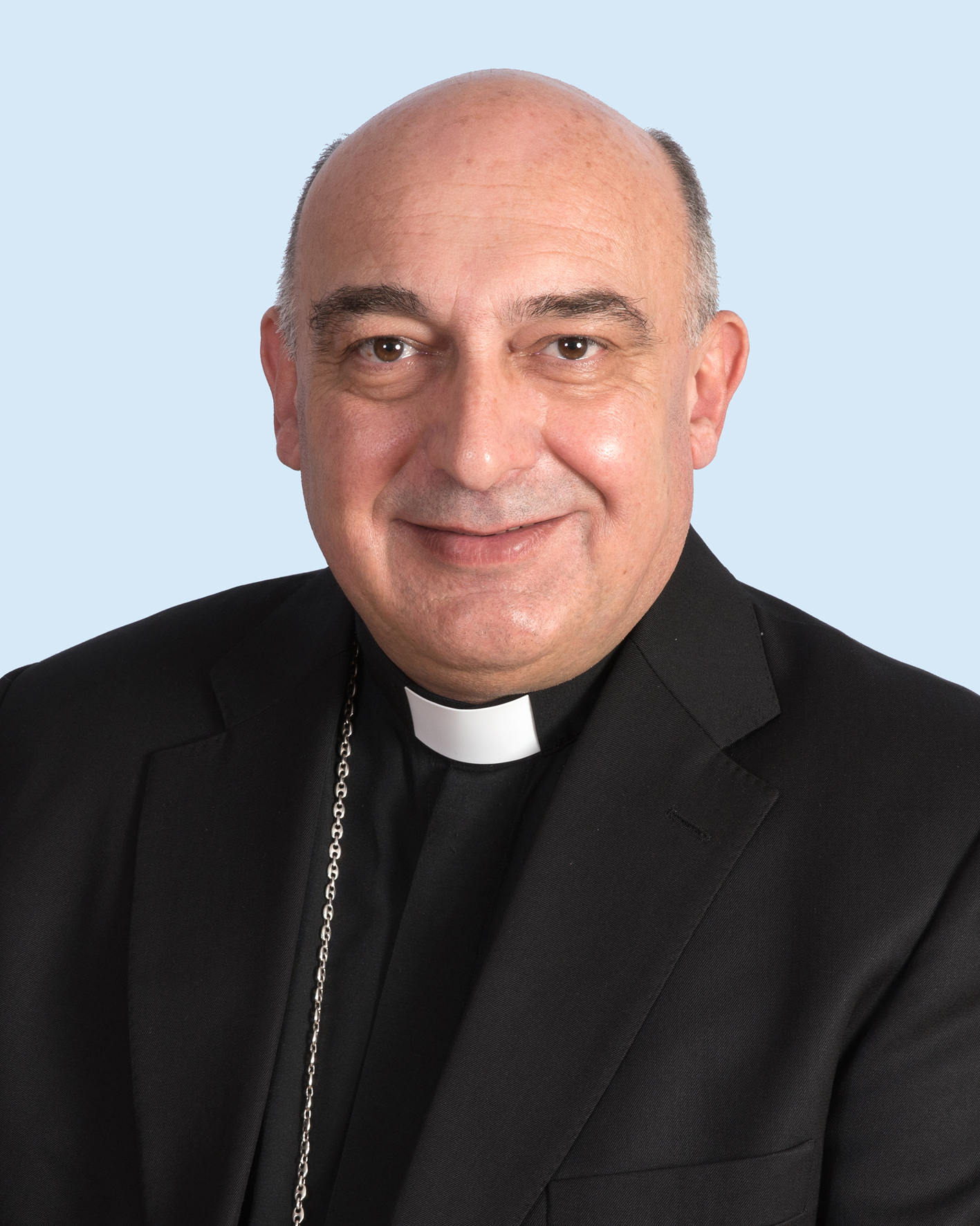
- Church: Roman Catholic Church
- Archdiocese: Valencia
- Province: Valencia
- Metropolis: Valencia
- See: Valencia
- Appointed: 10 October 2022
- Installed: 10 December 2022
- Predecessor: Antonio Cañizares Llovera
- Previous post: Bishop of Tortosa (2013–22)

Orders
- Ordination: 8 November 1982 by Pope John Paul II
- Consecration: 8 January 2005 by Agustín García-Gasco y Vicente

Personal details
- Born: 25 April 1959 (age 67) Quatretonda, Spain
- Denomination: Roman Catholic
- Education: Pontifical Gregorian University
- Motto: In caritate et in verbo veritatis ("In charity and in the word of truth")
- Coat of arms: Enrique Benavent Vidal's coat of arms

Styles of Enrique Benavent Vidal
- Reference style: His Excellency; The Most Reverend
- Spoken style: Your Excellency
- Religious style: Archbishop

Enrique Benavent Vidal (born 25 April 1959) is a Spanish prelate of the Catholic Church who has been named Metropolitan Archbishop of Valencia. He was Bishop of Tortosa from 2013 to 2022 after serving as Auxiliary Bishop in Valencia from 2005 to 2013.

== Biography ==
Enrique Benavent Vidal was born on 25 April 1959 in Quatretonda. He attended the seminary of Valencia in Moncada and the San Vicente Ferrer Faculty of Theology. In 1993 he obtained a doctorate from the Pontifical Gregorian University in Rome. He was ordained a priest by Pope John Paul II during his visit to Valencia on 8 November 1982.

He was assistant parish priest and professor of religion in Alcoy (1982-1985); formator in the major seminary of Valencia in Moncada and Professor of Theology for the formation of deacons (1985-1990); episcopal delegate for the pastoral care of vocations (1993-1997); professor of dogmatic theology at the San Vicente Ferrer Faculty of Theology (1993-2004) and at the Valencia Section of the Pontifical John Paul II Institute for Studies on Marriage and Family (1994-2004); director of the San Juan de Ribera Major College in Burjassot (1999-2004); assistant dean and director of the Diocesan Section of the San Vicente Ferrer Faculty of Theology (2001-2004); member of the Presbyteral Council (2003-2004).

Pope John Paul II appointed him titular bishop of Rotdon and auxiliary bishop of Valencia on 8 November 2004. He received his episcopal consecration on 8 January 2005. At the time he was the youngest bishop in Spain.

Pope Francis named him bishop of Tortosa on 17 May 2013 and he was installed there on 13 July.

Pope Francis named him metropolitan archbishop of Valencia on 10 October 2022. His installation there is scheduled for 10 December. The head of the Valencian government, Ximo Puig, said his appointment would make it possible for increased cooperation with the Church as was not possible with his predecessor.

He is a member of the permanent commission of the Spanish Episcopal Conference. He was a member of its commission for the doctrine of the faith since 2008 and has been president of that commission since 2017. He was a member of its commission for seminaries and universities from 2008 to 2017.
