= José María García Lahiguera =

Spanish Roman Catholic archbishop

Venerable José María García Lahiguera
- Archbishop Emeritus of Valencia
- Church: Roman Catholic Church
- Archdiocese: Valencia
- See: Valencia
- Appointed: 1 July 1969
- Term ended: 25 May 1978
- Predecessor: Marcelino Olaechea Loizaga
- Successor: Miguel Roca Cabanellas
- Previous posts: Titular Bishop of Zela (1950-1964); Auxiliary Bishop of Madrid (1950-1964); Bishop of Huelva (1964-1969)

Orders
- Ordination: 29 May 1926
- Consecration: 29 October 1950 by Leopoldo Eijo y Garay
- Rank: Archbishop

Personal details
- Born: José María García Lahiguera; 9 March 1903 Fitero, Navarra, Spain
- Died: 14 July 1989 (aged 86) Madrid, Spain
- Motto: Sacerdos et hostia ("Priest and victim")

José María García Lahiguera (9 March 1903 – 14 July 1989) was a Spanish Roman Catholic who served as the Archbishop of Valencia from 1969 until his resignation came into effect in 1978. He established the Oblate Sisters of Christ the Priest.

Pope Benedict XVI approved his life of heroic virtue and conferred upon him the title of Venerable on 27 June 2011.

== Life ==
José María García Lahiguera was born on 9 March 1903 in Spain.

He completed his studies to become a priest and was ordained to the priesthood in 1926. He served as a spiritual director and became a doctor of canon law in 1928. He also served as a teacher and worked in the field of the education of children.

He formed groups of men and women of Catholic Action to treat the ill and those in the prisons, and placed an emphasis on the distribution of the Eucharist.

He established the Oblate Sisters of Christ the Priest, which Pope Pius XII provided papal approval for in 1950. He was consecrated in 1950 after he was nominated for the episcopate. He attended all sessions of the Second Vatican Council from 1962 to 1965. In 1964 Pope Paul VI appointed him as the Bishop of Huelva.

He was appointed as the Archbishop of Valencia in 1969 and focused on conciliar renewal and took care of the liturgical reform the council implemented. He resigned - as canon law required - in 1978 from his archdiocese.

He died in 1989.

== Beatification process ==
The cause of beatification commenced in Madrid on 20 June 1995 which conferred upon him the title of Servant of God. The diocesan process in Madrid spanned from 1995 until 22 September 2000; the local process was ratified in 2002. The Positio - documentation on his life of heroic virtue was submitted to the Congregation for the Causes of Saints for further evaluation in 2009.

He was proclaimed to be Venerable on 27 June 2011 when Pope Benedict XVI approved the fact that he lived a virtuous life.

== See also ==
- Catholic Church in Spain
