= Terzaga =

Terzaga, Spain
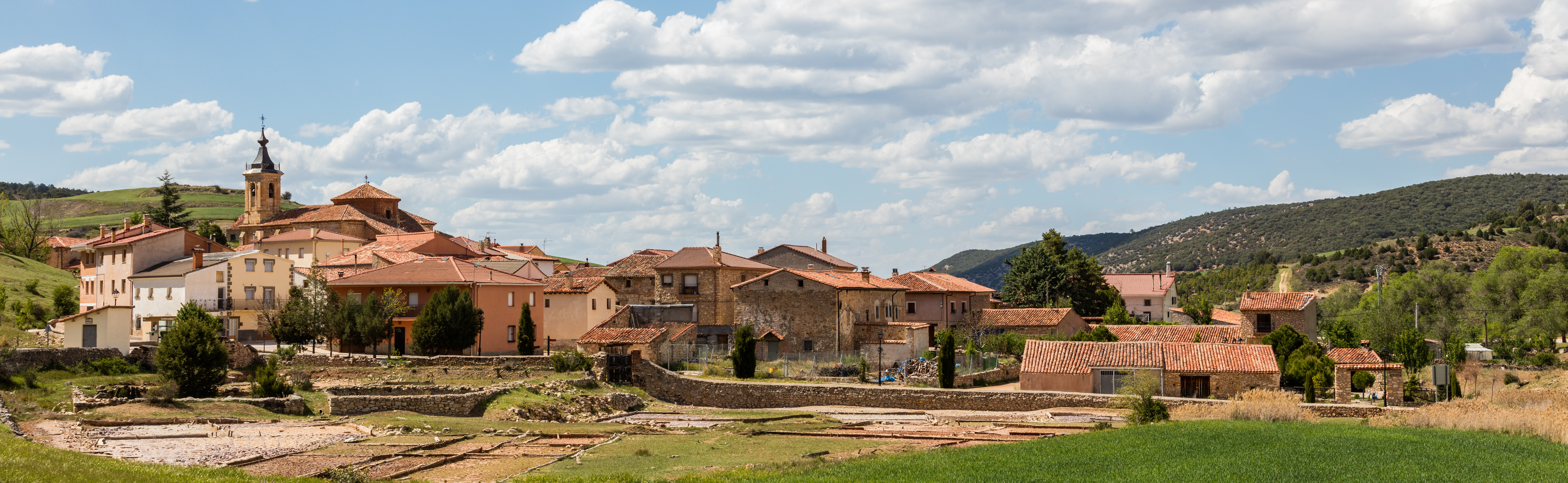

- Location within Province of Guadalajara Location within Castilla-La Mancha Location within Spain
- Coordinates: 40°41′46″N 1°54′08″W
- Country: Spain
- Autonomous community: Castile-La Mancha
- Province: Guadalajara
- Municipality: Terzaga

Area
  - Total: 33 km^{2} (13 sq mi)

Population (2025-01-01)
  - Total: 24
  - Density: 0.73/km^{2} (1.9/sq mi)
- Time zone: UTC+1 (CET)
  - Summer (DST): UTC+2 (CEST)

Terzaga is a municipality located in the province of Guadalajara, Castile-La Mancha, Spain. According to the 2022 census (INE), the municipality has a population of 20 inhabitants. It belongs to the Alto Tajo Natural Park and the Geopark of the Comarca Molina-Alto Tajo. It has an area of 33.81 km^{2}. From Guadalajara capital it is separated by a distance of 159 km. It is one of the localities through which the route of the Three Taifas of the Camino del Cid takes place.

== Climate ==
The climate is continental Mediterranean with very cold winters where temperatures drop below -15 °C and hot summers where temperatures can exceed 30 °C during the day. The average annual temperature in Terzaga is 9.8 °C. The annual precipitation is 519 mm, it rains during all seasons although moderately and from the end of October to May there can also be precipitation in the form of snow. It is inside the "Ice Triangle" (Teruel, Calamocha and Molina de Aragón), the Spanish Siberia, where the lowest extreme temperatures are recorded each winter.
