= Agustín García-Gasco Vicente =

Spanish Cardinal

His Eminence Agustín García-Gasco
- Cardinal, Archbishop emeritus of Valencia
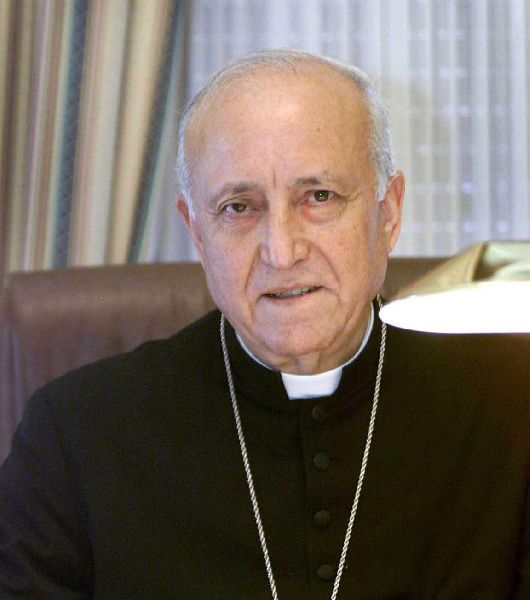
- Church: Roman Catholic
- Archdiocese: Valencia
- Installed: 1992
- Term ended: 8 January 2009
- Predecessor: Miguel Roca Cabanellas
- Successor: Carlos Osoro Sierra
- Other post: Cardinal-Priest of San Marcello
- Previous post: Auxiliary Bishop of Madrid (1985–1992)

Orders
- Ordination: 26 May 1956
- Consecration: 11 May 1985
- Created cardinal: 24 November 2007 by Benedict XVI
- Rank: Cardinal-Priest

Personal details
- Born: 12 February 1931 Corral de Almaguer, Spain
- Died: 1 May 2011 (aged 80) Rome, Italy
- Motto: In nomine Tuo laxabo rete
- Coat of arms: Agustín García-Gasco's coat of arms

Styles of Agustín García-Gasco Vicente
- Reference style: His Eminence
- Spoken style: Your Eminence
- Informal style: Cardinal
- See: Valencia

Agustín García-Gasco y Vicente (12 February 1931 – 1 May 2011) was a Spanish Cardinal of the Catholic Church. He served as Archbishop of Valencia from 1992 to 2009, and was elevated to the cardinalate in 2007.

== Biography ==
Born in Corral de Almaguer, García-Gasco y Vicente entered the seminary of Madrid-Alcalá in 1944 and was ordained a priest on 26 May 1956 by Leopoldo Eijo y Garay, bishop of Madrid-Alcalá, patriarch of the Western Indies. He served as pastor in Villamanta and Episcopal Delegate of Diocesan Cáritas. He was also a member of Diocesan Pastoral Junta, 1963–1966. Pastor of the parish of Santísimo Cristo del Amor, Madrid, in 1964. In 1966, he was named prefect of theologians and professor of the Seminary of Madrid. In 1970, pastor of the parish Santiago y San Juan Bautista, Madrid. Professor of religion of U.N.E.D. (Universidad Nacional de Educación a Distancia) and diocesan delegate of the clergy, 1973. In 1977, he was named episcopal vicar of the III Viacariate of Madrid. In 1979, he was designated professor of Instituto Teolsgico "San Damaso"; and in 1982, president of Institución Arzobispo Claret.

In 1985 he was made auxiliary bishop of Madrid, Spain and Titular bishop of Nona. On 24 July 1992 he became Archbishop of Valencia. He retired as Archbishop of Valencia on 8 January 2009.

On 17 October 2007, Pope Benedict XVI announced that he would make Archbishop García-Gasco y Vicente a Cardinal. García-Gasco y Vicente was created Cardinal-Priest of San Marcello in the consistory at St. Peter's Basilica on 24 November 2007. He lost his right to voting in papal conclave on 12 February 2011, when he turned 80. He died because of a heart attack on 1 May 2011, in Rome, day of the Beatification of Pope John Paul II. In November his official portrait was unveiled by the archdiocese of Valencia.

== Sources ==
- (in Spanish) Biography on the Valencia Archdiocese web site
- (in English) Data on www.catholic-hierarchy.org web site, at the page
- (in English) Data on www.gcatholic.org web site, at the page
- (in English) Data on The Cardinals of the Holy Roman Church web site, at the page
