= Socialist Party of the Islands =

Defunct socialist party in Spain

Socialist Party of the Islands Partit Socialista de les Illes
- Secretary-General: Sebastià Serra i Busquets
- Founded: 18 February 1976
- Dissolved: December 1977
- Succeeded by: Socialist Party of Majorca
- Ideology: Democratic Socialism; Catalan nationalism Self-determination; Antifascism; Workers' self-management
- Political position: Left-wing
- National affiliation: Socialist Unity (1977)

PSI sticker

Socialist Party of the Islands (Catalan: Partit Socialista de les Illes, PSI) was a political party in the Balearic Islands, Spain.

== History ==
PSI was formed in February 1976 by a sector of the socialist movement who wanted emphasis on the nationality question, establishing itself in Majorca. In parallel, the Socialist Movement of Menorca (MSM) and the Socialist Movement of Ibiza and Formentera (MSEF) were created in with the same aim in the other islands. PSI was part of the Federation of Socialist Parties and, together with the Socialist Convergence of Catalonia (CSC) and the Socialist Party of the Valencian Country (PSPV), part of the Socialist Coordination of the Catalan Countries.

Ahead of the 1977 general election, PSI created an alliance together with MSM and MSEF, joining the People's Socialist Party (PSP) in the Socialist Unity (US) coalition. US did not gain any seat in the Congress nor in the Senate in the Balearic Islands constituency. After the election, PSI refused to merge with the Balearic federation of the Spanish Socialist Workers' Party, and instead founded the Socialist Party of Majorca (PSM).

== See also ==
- Socialist Party of Majorca
