= Ibiza (city) =

Ibiza Eivissa
- Municipality
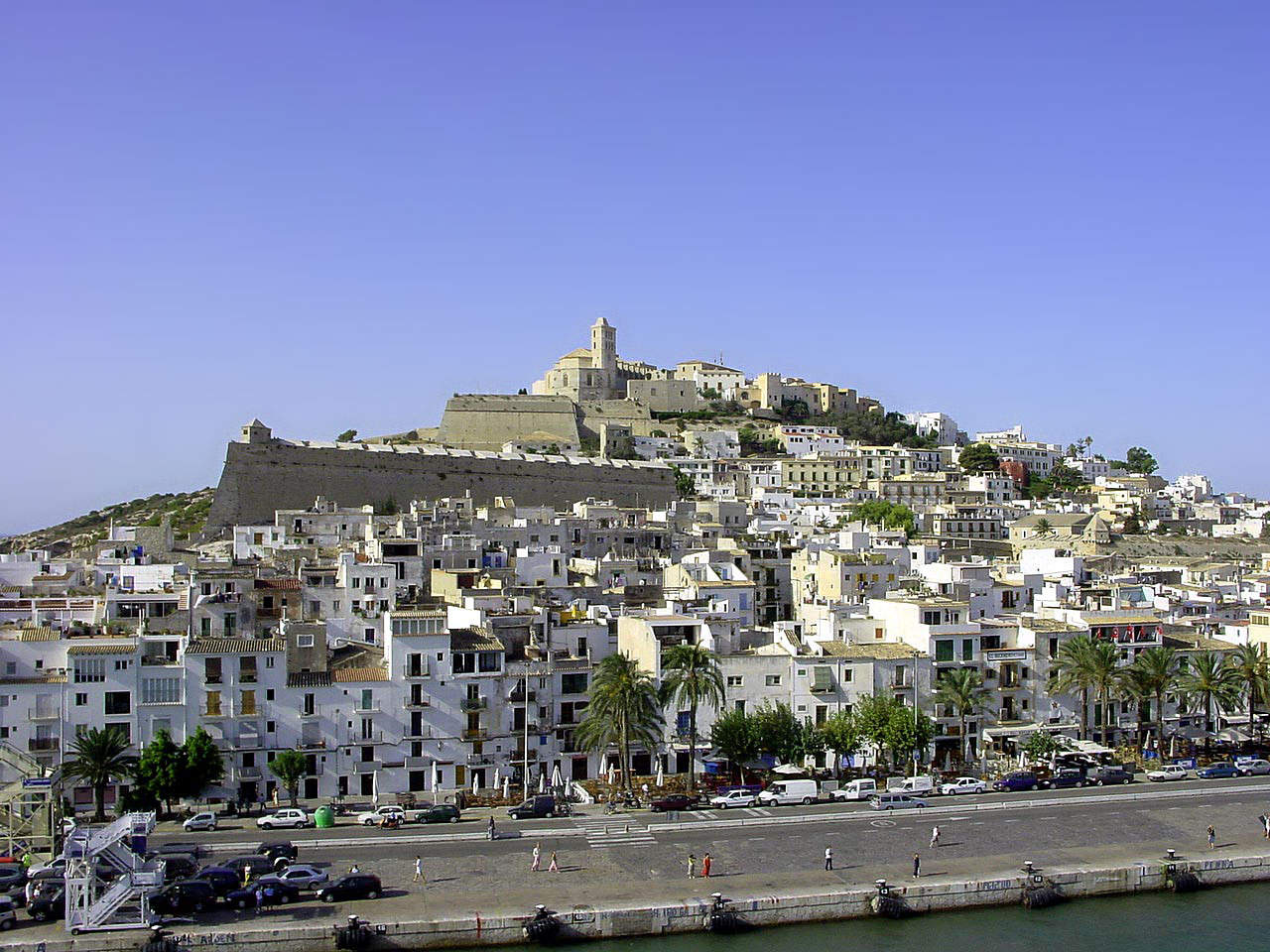
- View of the Dalt Vila of Eivissa and its cathedral

- Flag Coat of arms
- Nickname(s): Vila d'Eivissa, or simply Vila
- Interactive map of Ibiza
- Location within Ibiza Location within Balearic Islands Location within Spain
- Coordinates: 38°54′32″N 1°25′58″E
- Country: Spain
- Autonomous community: Balearic Islands
- Province: Balearic Islands
- Island: Ibiza
- Judicial district: Ibiza
- Founded: 654 BC

Government
  - Mayor: Rafael Triguero Costa (PP)

Area
  - Total: 11.14 km^{2} (4.30 sq mi)
- Elevation: 99 m (325 ft)

Population (2025-01-01)
  - Total: 55,337
  - Density: 4,967/km^{2} (12,870/sq mi)
- Demonym(s): Ibizan • eivissenc, -a (Cat.) • ibicenco/a (Sp.)
- Time zone: UTC+1 (CET)
  - Summer (DST): UTC+2 (CEST)
- Postal code: 07800
- Official language(s): Catalan; Spanish
- Website: Official website

Ibiza (Spanish: [iˈβiθa]; Catalan: Eivissa [əjˈvisə], commonly also Vila d'Eivissa [ˈvilə ðəjˈvisə] or simply Vila [ˈvilə]) is a city and municipality located on the southeast coast of the island of Ibiza in the Balearic Islands autonomous community.

The city is commonly divided into two parts: the old town, located on a fortified hilltop and called the Dalt Vila (literally "Upper Town") and the more modern part, called the Eixample ("Extension").

Sights in the city include the cathedral of Santa Maria d'Eivissa, located at the top of the Dalt Vila, and the Punic necropolis of Puig des Molins. Nearby is the Sagrat Cor de Jesus monument, a 23-metre-high (75 ft) statue inspired by Christ the Redeemer, which is 3.1 miles (5.0 km) north of the city.

== History ==
The first inhabitants of the area were Phoenicians and Aiboshim is claimed to have been founded in 654 BC. The city had a population of 3,000 to 4,000 by the 5th century BC. The city was incorporated into the Roman Republic as a federated city until Emperor Vespasian turned it into Municipius Flavius Ebusus in 70 AD. The area was conquered by the Vandals in 424, and by the Byzantine Empire in 535.

The area was incorporated into Al-Andalus in the 10th century and a new irrigation system was developed during this period. During the reign of King James I of Aragon the island was conquered by Guillem de Montgrí in August 1235. King James II of Aragon established a local government in 1299, and this lasted until 1717. The city was attacked by Peter of Castile during a war between Castile and Aragon in 1354.

King Philip V of Spain issued the Decree of New Planta in 1715, which introduced the town hall government. The town was granted the title of city by King Charles III of Spain in 1782. The title of city was required for the creation of the Roman Catholic Diocese of Ibiza in 1782; Manuel Abad y Lasierra was its first bishop.

UNESCO declared the city a World Heritage Site on 4 December 1999.

== Population ==
The city has a population of 50,643 (2021).

Historical population
Year	Pop.	±%
1842	5,118	—
1857	5,551	+8.5%
1877	7,567	+36.3%
1887	7,634	+0.9%
1900	6,404	−16.1%
1910	6,657	+4.0%
1920	6,751	+1.4%
1930	7,766	+15.0%
1940	10,502	+35.2%
1950	11,333	+7.9%
1960	10,753	−5.1%
1970	15,642	+45.5%
1981	25,343	+62.0%
1991	29,935	+18.1%
2001	34,826	+16.3%
2011	48,550	+39.4%
2021	50,566	+4.2%
Source: INE

Location of Ibiza City within Ibiza

== Climate ==
Between 1981 and 2010, the month with the highest average temperature was August at 26.3 °C (79 °F) and the month with the lowest was January at 11.9 °C (53 °F). The highest daily average temperature was 30.3 °C (87 °F) in August and the lowest daily average temperature was 8.1 °C (47 °F) in January. January was the only month to report snow. 413 millimetres (16 in) of rain was reported for the entire year with October having the highest at 58 mm and July having the lowest at 5 mm. Freezes and extreme temperatures are rare due to the influence of the sea. Ibiza has never been above 39 °C (102 °F) or under −3 °C (27 °F) since temperature records began in 1952. The average temperature of the sea around Ibiza is 19.7 °C (67 °F).

Climate data for Aeropuerto de Ibiza 6 metres (20 feet) (1981–2010), extremes (1953–2021)
Month	Jan	Feb	Mar	Apr	May	Jun	Jul	Aug	Sep	Oct	Nov	Dec	Year
Record high °C (°F)	24.7 (76.5)	23.5 (74.3)	26.5 (79.7)	27.8 (82.0)	31.0 (87.8)	36.5 (97.7)	36.6 (97.9)	37.0 (98.6)	38.4 (101.1)	32.0 (89.6)	28.4 (83.1)	23.8 (74.8)	38.4 (101.1)
Mean daily maximum °C (°F)	15.7 (60.3)	15.9 (60.6)	17.7 (63.9)	19.7 (67.5)	22.7 (72.9)	26.8 (80.2)	29.7 (85.5)	30.3 (86.5)	27.7 (81.9)	24.0 (75.2)	19.6 (67.3)	16.7 (62.1)	22.2 (72.0)
Daily mean °C (°F)	11.9 (53.4)	12.1 (53.8)	13.7 (56.7)	15.6 (60.1)	18.6 (65.5)	22.6 (72.7)	25.6 (78.1)	26.3 (79.3)	23.8 (74.8)	20.2 (68.4)	15.9 (60.6)	13.1 (55.6)	18.3 (64.9)
Mean daily minimum °C (°F)	8.1 (46.6)	8.3 (46.9)	9.6 (49.3)	11.4 (52.5)	14.6 (58.3)	18.4 (65.1)	21.4 (70.5)	22.2 (72.0)	19.9 (67.8)	16.5 (61.7)	12.3 (54.1)	9.5 (49.1)	14.3 (57.7)
Record low °C (°F)	−1.2 (29.8)	−3.0 (26.6)	0.8 (33.4)	3.4 (38.1)	6.8 (44.2)	10.0 (50.0)	14.0 (57.2)	11.0 (51.8)	11.4 (52.5)	6.3 (43.3)	1.0 (33.8)	0.4 (32.7)	−3.0 (26.6)
Average precipitation mm (inches)	37 (1.5)	36 (1.4)	27 (1.1)	31 (1.2)	27 (1.1)	11 (0.4)	5 (0.2)	18 (0.7)	57 (2.2)	58 (2.3)	53 (2.1)	52 (2.0)	413 (16.3)
Average precipitation days (≥ 1 mm)	5	5	3	4	3	1	1	2	4	6	6	5	45
Average snowy days	0.1	0.0	0.0	0.0	0.0	0.0	0.0	0.0	0.0	0.0	0.0	0.0	0.1
Mean monthly sunshine hours	162	166	211	246	272	299	334	305	236	205	157	151	2,744
Percentage possible sunshine	52	54	57	63	63	67	72	70	66	60	52	54	61
Source 1: Agencia Estatal de Meteorología
Source 2: Agencia Estatal de Meteorología, Met Office

Climate data for Ibiza
Month	Jan	Feb	Mar	Apr	May	Jun	Jul	Aug	Sep	Oct	Nov	Dec	Year
Average sea temperature °C (°F)	14.7 (58.5)	14.3 (57.7)	14.5 (58.0)	16.3 (61.4)	19.1 (66.3)	22.5 (72.6)	25.1 (77.1)	26.2 (79.1)	25.2 (77.4)	22.7 (72.9)	19.6 (67.3)	16.6 (61.8)	19.7 (67.5)
Mean daily daylight hours	10.0	11.0	12.0	13.0	14.0	15.0	15.0	14.0	12.0	11.0	10.0	9.0	12.2
Average Ultraviolet index	2	3	5	6	8	9	9	8	6	4	3	2	5.4
Source #1: seatemperature.org
Source: Weather Atlas

== Gallery ==
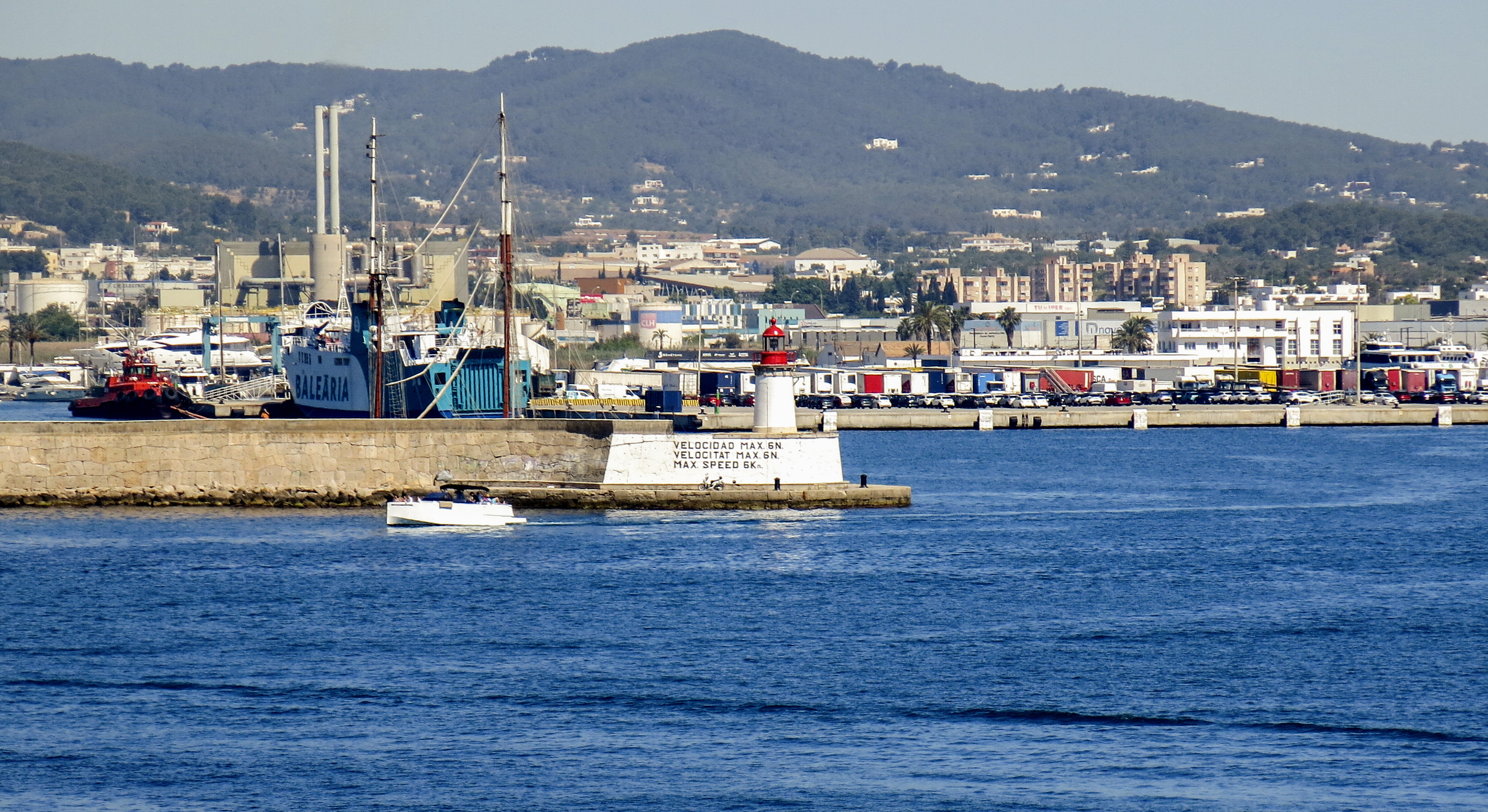
Old seawall of the port

== See also ==
- List of municipalities in Balearic Islands
- Ses Feixes Wetlands

== Works cited ==
- "Eivissa: Patrimoni de la Humanitat". Ibiza. Archived from the original on 5 July 2025.
- "Evolució de la Ciutat d'Eivissa". Ibiza. Archived from the original on 5 July 2025.
- "Orígens de la institució". Ibiza. Archived from the original on 23 May 2025.
- "Valores climatológicos normales. Ibiza, Aeropuerto". State Meteorological Agency. Archived from the original on 5 July 2025.
