= Llucmajor =

- Municipality
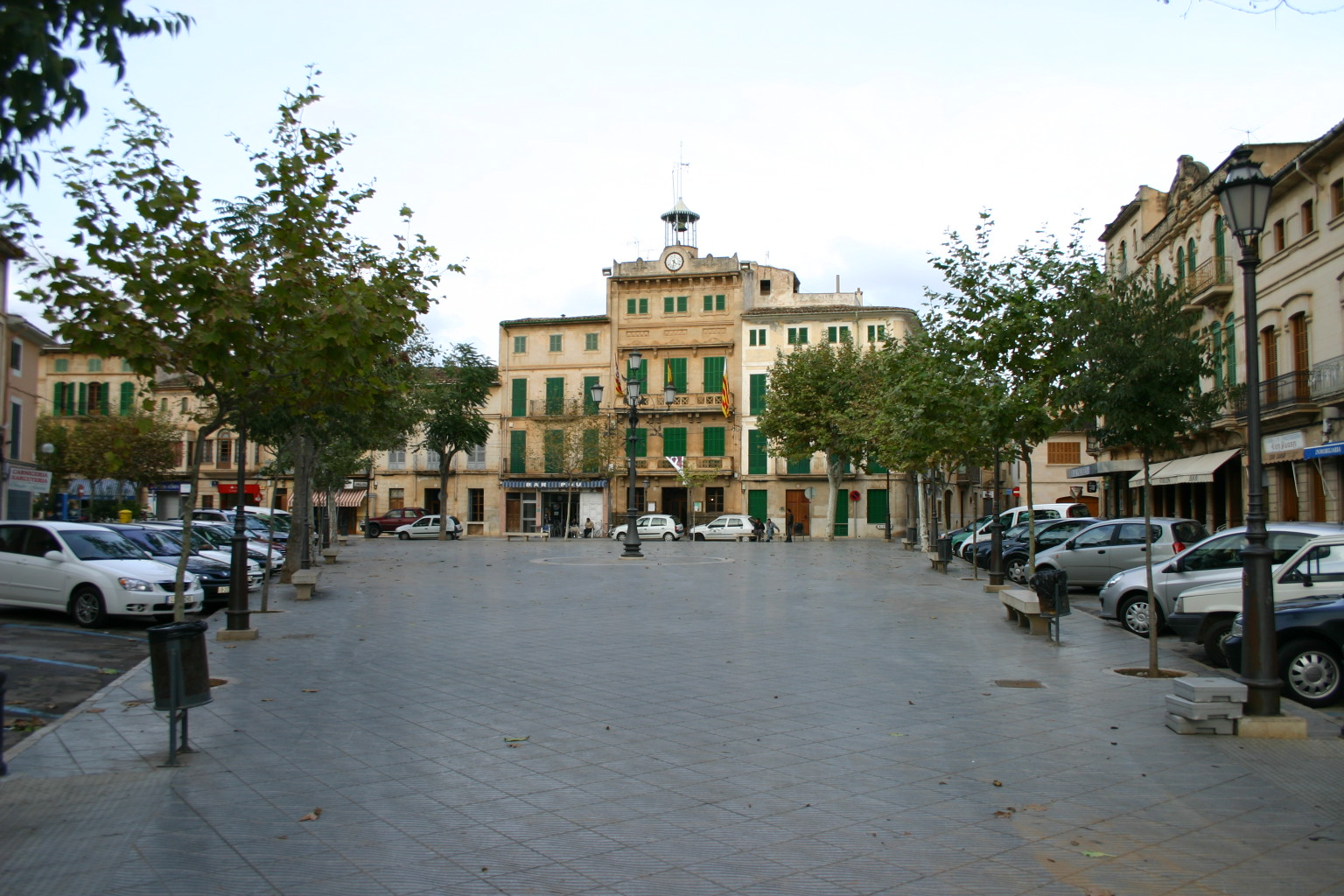
- Spain Square.

- Flag Coat of arms

- Location of Llucmajor in Mallorca

- Location in Majorca Llucmajor (Balearic Islands) Llucmajor (Spain)
- Coordinates: 39°29′N 2°53′E
- Country: Spain
- Autonomous community: Balearic Islands
- Province: Balearic Islands
- Comarca: Migjorn
- Judicial district: Palma de Mallorca

Government
  - Mayor: Joan Jaume

Area
  - Total: 327.33 km^{2} (126.38 sq mi)

Population (2025-01-01)
  - Total: 40,502
  - Density: 123.73/km^{2} (320.47/sq mi)
- Demonym: Llucmajorer/era
- Time zone: UTC+1 (CET)
  - Summer (DST): UTC+2 (CEST)
- Postal code: 07620

Llucmajor (Balearic Catalan: [ʎuɡməˈʒo], also [ʎumːəˈʒo]; Spanish: Lluchmayor) is the largest municipality (in terms of surface area) of the Balearic Island of Mallorca.

There are sixteen urban settlements in the municipality, including the town of Llucmajor and the coastal areas of s'Arenal, Cala Blava and Cala Pi.

== Urban settlements ==
The population numbers in brackets are from 1 January 2005, and do not include people living outside the settlements, so that the numbers do not total the entire population of the municipality. (Source: INE).

- s'Arenal (9,563 inhabitants)
- Llucmajor (9,312 inhabitants)
- Badia Gran (1,719 inhabitants)
- Badia Blava (1,536 inhabitants)
- les Palmeres (1,140 inhabitants)
- sa Torre (1,197 inhabitants)
- Son Verí Nou (651 inhabitants)
- Maioris Décima (628 inhabitants)
- Tolleric (336 inhabitants)
- Cala Blava (309 inhabitants)
- Bellavista (305 inhabitants)
- s'Estanyol de Migjorn (288 inhabitants)
- Cala Pi (241 inhabitants)
- Puigderrós (187 inhabitants)
- es Pas de Vallgornera (76 inhabitants)
- Vallgornera Nou (54 inhabitants)

The population is distributed basically among the town, s'Arenal and the residential areas.

== Town of Llucmajor ==
The town of Llucmajor, which has a population of 9,312 inhabitants, is the capital of the municipality. It is about 15 km (9.3 mi) southeast of Palma Airport, at the foot (about 4 km southwest) of Puig de Randa mountain on the road from Palma to Santanyí. Since the town is also about 15 km (9.3 mi) from the coast, it is not especially geared towards tourists.

=== History ===
The first church in Llucmajor was erected in 1259. In 1300 it was elevated to "villa" by James II of Majorca. The most important historical event in connection with the town is the Battle of Llucmajor, where in 1349 Peter IV of Aragon defeated his cousin James III of Majorca, resulting in the end of the independent Kingdom of Majorca. James was killed on the battlefield northeast of the town. He was first buried in the parish church of the town. Today his grave is located in the cathedral of Palma.

In 1543 Charles V granted the city the right to hold a market on Wednesdays and Fridays.

In the 20th century Llucmajor developed into an industrial centre (especially for shoemaking), and so achieved a degree of prosperity.

== Politics and government ==
In 1979, Miquel Clar Lladó became the first democratically elected Mayor of Llucmajor following the end of the Franco dictatorship.

== Economy ==
Llucmajor town is a solid manufacturing town that specialises mainly in shoes. The town economy also relies on tourism.

Air Europa is headquartered in the Centro Empresarial Globalia ("Globalia Business Centre") in Llucmajor.

== Main sights ==
- Town hall
- Church of Sant Miquel from the 18th century on the Plaça Santa Catalina Tomàs
- Memorial for James III on the Passeig Jaume III
- Shoemakers' memorial at the western town gate
