= Archdiocese of Valencia in Spain =

Roman Catholic archdiocese in Spain

Coordinates: 39.4758°N 0.3750°W

Metropolitan Archdiocese of Valencia Archidioecesis Valentinus Arxidiòcesi de València (val) Archidiócesis de Valencia (es)

Catholic
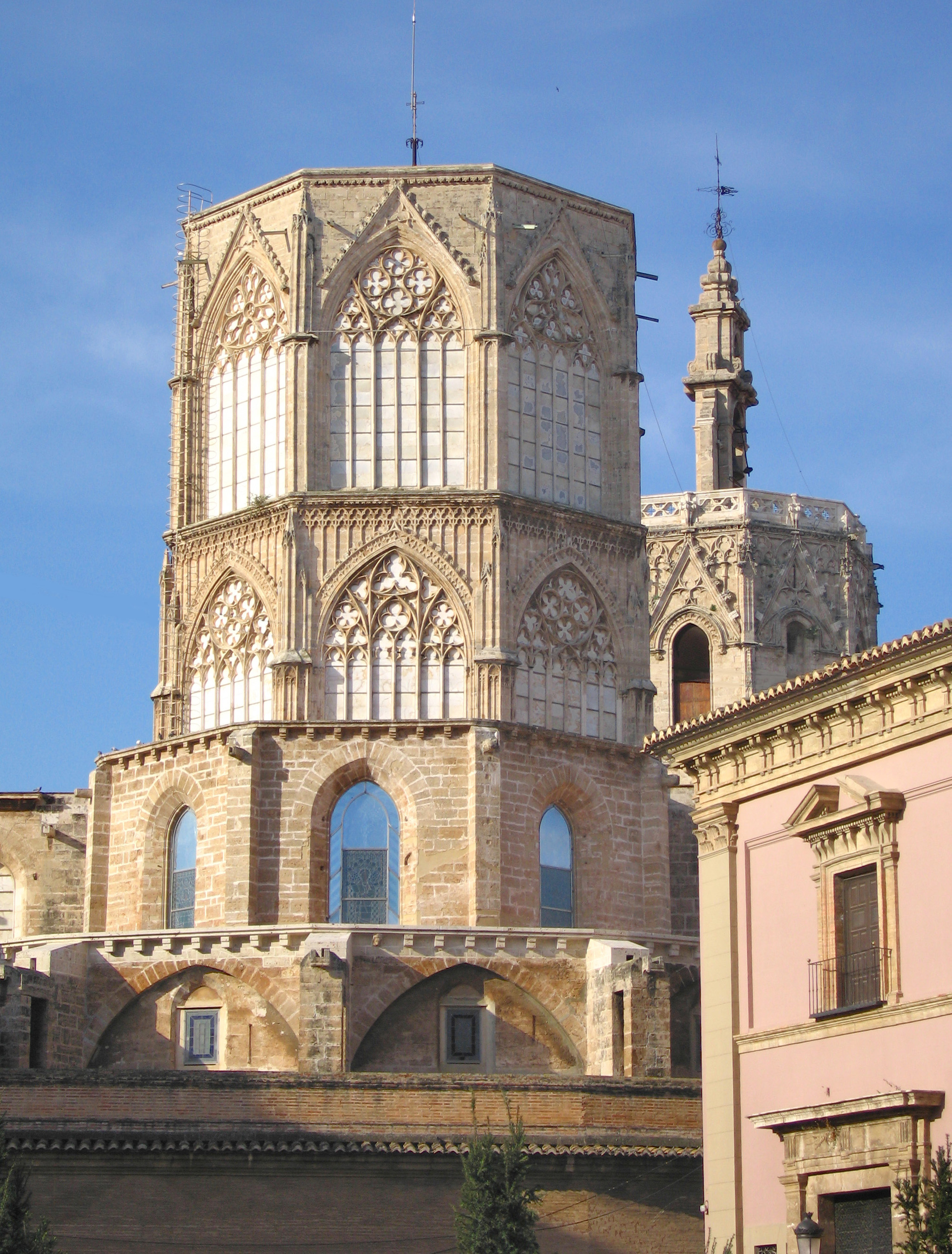
- Valencia Cathedral

Location
- Country: Spain
- Ecclesiastical province: Valencia

Statistics
- Area: 13,060 km^{2} (5,040 sq mi)
- Population: Total; Catholics: (as of 2010); 3,213,000; 3,030,000 (94.3%)

Information
- Denomination: Catholic
- Sui iuris church: Latin Church
- Rite: Roman Rite
- Established: 10 October 1238 (as Diocese of Valencia); 9 July 1492 (as Archdiocese of Valencia)
- Cathedral: Cathedral Basilica of the Assumption of Our Lady in Valencia

Current leadership
- Pope: Leo XIV
- Archbishop: Enrique Benavent Vidal
- Suffragans: Diocese of Ibiza; Diocese of Majorca; Diocese of Menorca; Diocese of Orihuela-Alicante; Diocese of Segorbe-Castellón
- Auxiliary Bishops: Arturo Javier García Pérez; Fernando Enrique Ramón Casas
- Bishops emeritus: Antonio Cañizares Llovera; Javier Salinas Viñals

Map

Website
- archivalencia.org

The Archdiocese of Valencia (Latin: Archidioecesis Valentinus) is a Latin Church diocese of the Catholic Church located in north-eastern Spain, in the province of Valencia, part of the autonomous community of Valencia. The archdiocese heads the ecclesiastical province of Valencia, with authority over the suffragan dioceses of Ibiza, Majorca, Minorca, Orihuela-Alicante and Segorbe-Castellón. The archbishops are seated in Valencia Cathedral. Enrique Benavent Vidal succeeded Cardinal Antonio Cañizares Llovera as the Archbishop of Valencia in 2022.

== Overview ==
The Diocese of Valencia was created in as early as the 6th century; Pope Innocent VIII elevated it to an archdiocese in 1492.

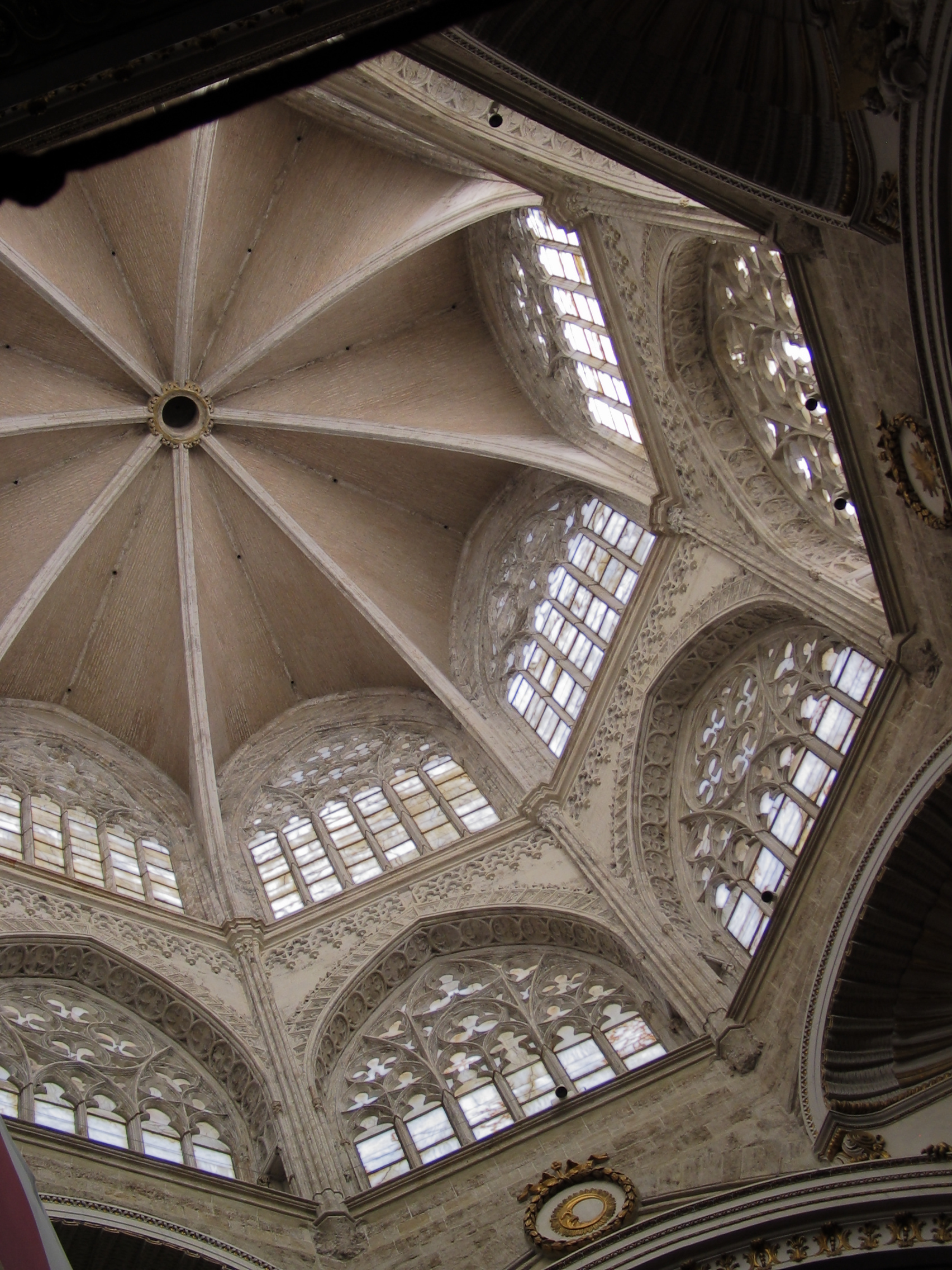
Valencia Cathedral

The cathedral in the early days of the Reconquest was called Església Major, then Seu (Sedes), and at the present time, in virtue of the papal concession of 16 October 1866, it is called the Basílica metropolitana. It is situated in the centre of the ancient Roman city where some believe the temple of Diana stood. In Gothic times it seems to have been dedicated to the most Holy Saviour; El Cid dedicated it to the Blessed Virgin; King James the Conqueror did likewise, leaving in the main chapel the image of the Blessed Virgin which he carried with him and which is believed to be the one which is now preserved in the sacristy. The Moorish mosque, which had been converted into a Christian church by the conqueror, appeared unworthy of the title of the cathedral of Valencia, and, in 1262, Bishop Andreu d'Albalat laid the cornerstone of the new Gothic building, with three naves; these reach only to the choir of the present building. Bishop Vidal de Blanes built the magnificent chapter hall, and Jaume of Aragon added the tower, called "Micalet" because it was blessed on St. Michael's day (1418), which is 51 metres (166 ft) high and finished at the top with a belfry.

In the 15th century the dome was added and the naves extended back of the choir, uniting the building to the tower and forming a main entrance. Archbishop Luis Alfonso de los Cameros began the building of the main chapel in 1674; the walls were decorated with marbles and bronzes in the over-ornate style of that decadent period. At the beginning of the 18th century, the German, Conrad Rudolphus, built the façade of the main entrance. The other two doors lead into the transept; one, that of the Apostles in pure pointed Gothic, dates from the 14th century, the other is that of the Paláu. The additions made to the back of the cathedral detract from its height. The 18th-century restoration rounded the pointed arches, covered the Gothic columns with Corinthian pillars, and redecorated the walls. The dome has no lantern, its plain ceiling being pierced by two large side windows. There are four chapels on either side, besides that at the end and those that open into the choir, the transept, and the presbyterium. It contains many paintings by eminent artists. A magnificent silver reredos, which was behind the altar, was carried away in the war of 1808, and converted into coin to meet the expenses of the campaign. Behind the Chapel of the Blessed Sacrament is a very beautiful little Renaissance chapel built by Pope Callixtus III. Beside the cathedral is the chapel dedicated to the Virgen de los desamparados.

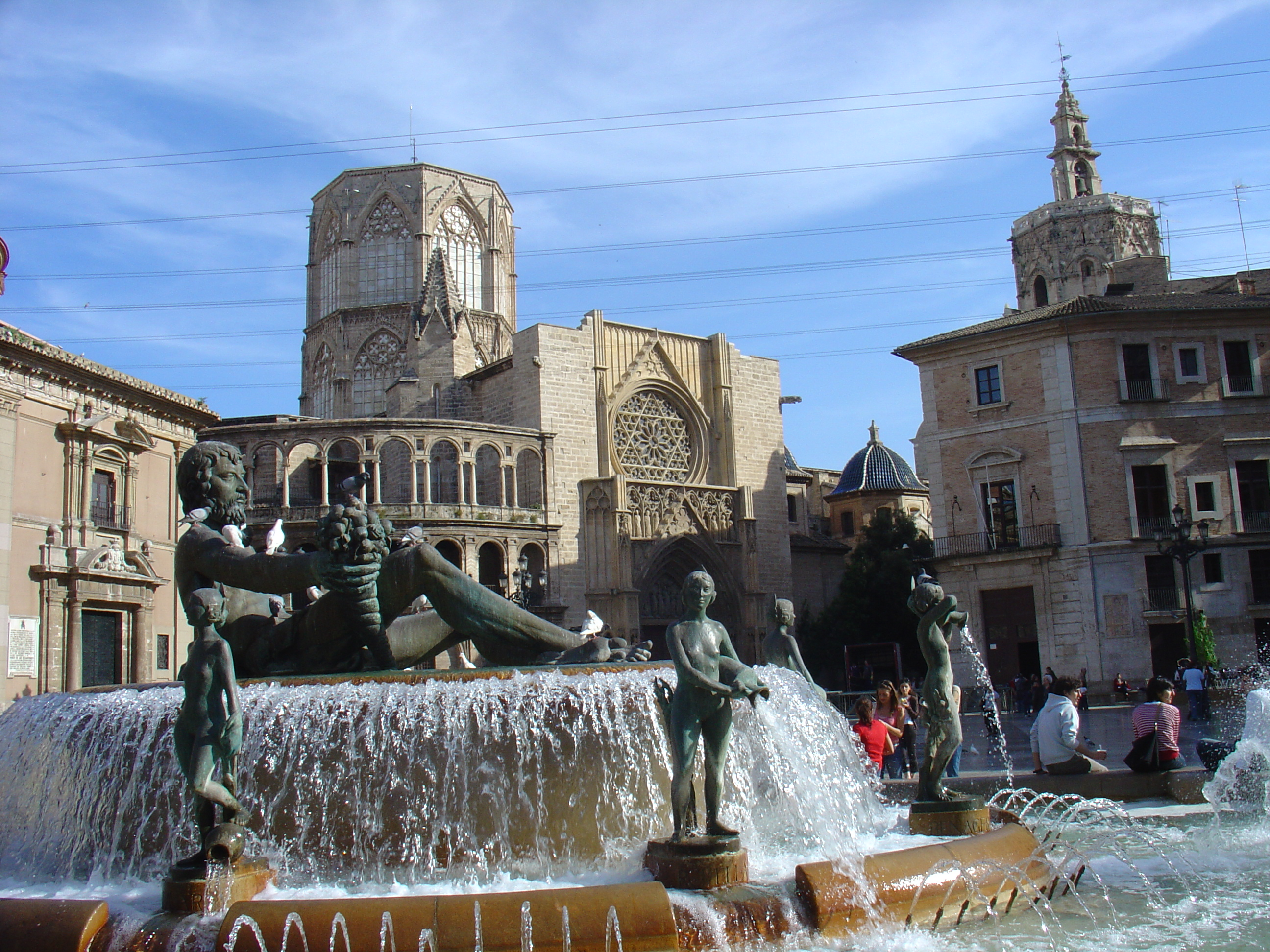
Valencia Cathedral

In 1409 a hospital was founded and placed under the patronage of Santa María de los Innocentes; to this was attached a confraternity devoted to recovering the bodies of the unfriended dead in the city and within a radius of 5 kilometres (3 mi) around it. At the end of the 15th century this confraternity separated from the hospital, and continued this work under the name of Cofradía para el amparo de los desamparados. King Philip IV and the Duke of Arcos suggested the building of the new chapel, and, in 1647, the Viceroy Conde de Orpesa, who had been preserved from the bubonic plague, insisted on carrying out their project. The Blessed Virgin under the title of Virgen de los desamparados was proclaimed patroness of the city, and Archbishop Pedro de Urbina y Montoya, on 31 June 1652, laid the cornerstone of the new chapel of this name.

The Archiepiscopal Palace, a grain market in the time of the Moors, is simple in design, with an inside cloister and a handsome chapel. In 1357, the arch which connects it with the cathedral was built. In the council chamber are preserved the portraits of all the prelates of Valencia.

Among the parish churches those deserving special mention are:

- Sts. John (Baptist and Evangelist), rebuilt in 1368, whose dome, decorated by Palonino, contains some of the best frescoes of Spain.
- The Temple (El Temple), the ancient church of the Knights Templar, which passed into the hands of the Order of Montesa and which was rebuilt in the reigns of Ferdinand VI and Charles III.
- The former convent of the Dominicans, at present the headquarters of the capital general, the cloister of which has a beautiful Gothic wing and the chapter room, large columns imitating palm trees.
- The Colegio del Corpus Christi, which is devoted to the exclusive worship of the Blessed Sacrament, and in which perpetual adoration is carried on.
- The Jesuit college, which was destroyed (1868) by the revolutionary Committee, but rebuilt on the same site.
- The Colegio de San Juan (also of the Society), the former college of the nobles, now a provincial institute for secondary instruction.

The Seminary was built in 1831; from 1790 it was situated at the former house of studies of the Jesuits. Since the Concordat of 1851 it ranks as a central seminary with the faculty of conferring academic degrees.

There have been in Valencia, since very remote times, schools founded by the bishops and directed by ecclesiastics. In 1412, a studium generale with special statutes was established. Pope Alexander VI raised it to the rank of a university on 23 January 1500. King Ferdinand the Catholic confirmed this two years later. In 1830, the building was reconstructed; a statute of Lluís Vives adorns the corridor.

Among the hospitals and charitable institutions may be mentioned:

- The Casa de Misericordia.
- The Provincial hospital.
- The orphan asylum of San Vicente.
- The Infant Asylum of the Marqués de Campo.

In Gandia there was a university, and the palace of Saint Francis Borgia, now the novitiate of the Society of Jesus, is preserved.

== History ==
=== Roman period (until the 5th century) ===
The city of Valencia is in the region known in ancient days as Edetania. Florus says that Junius Brutus, the conqueror of Viriathus, transferred thither (140 B.C.) the soldiers who had fought under the latter. Later it was a Roman military colony. In punishment for its adherence to Sertorius it was destroyed by Pompey, but was later rebuilt, and Pomponius Mela says that it was one of the principal cities of Hispania Tarraconensis.

Nothing positive is known about the introduction of Christianity into Valencia, but at the beginning of the 4th century when Dacianus brought the martyrs Saint Valerius, Bishop of Saragossa, and his deacon, Saint Vincent of Huesca, to Valencia, the Christians seem to have been numerous. Saint Vincent suffered martyrdom at Valencia; the faithful obtained possession of his remains, built a temple over the spot on which he died, and there invoked his intercession.

=== Visigoth period (5th to 7th centuries) ===
The first historically known Bishop of Valencia is Justinianus (531–546), mentioned by St. Isidore in his Viri illustres. Justinianus wrote Responsiones, a series of replies to a certain Rusticus.

Bishops of Valencia attended the various councils of Toledo. Witisclus, present at the Sixteenth Council of Toledo (693), was the last bishop before the Muslim invasion.

=== Muslim period (c. 712–1238) ===
Abdelazid, son of Muzza, took the city in c. 712 and, breaking the terms of surrender, pillaged it; he turned the churches into mosques, leaving only one to the Christians. This was without doubt the present Church of San Bartolomé or that of San Vincente de la Roqueta. Valencia was in the power of the Moors for more than five centuries. It is said that at the time of the Moorish invasion the people of Valencia placed the body of Saint Vincent in a boat and that the boat landed on the cape which is now called São Vincente. The King of Portugal, Afonso Henriques, found the body and transferred it to Lisbon.

El Cid (Rodrigo Díaz de Vivar) reconquered Valencia for the first time on 15 June 1094, turned nine mosques into churches, and installed as bishop the French monk Jérôme. On the death of the Cid (in July 1099), his wife, Doña Ximena, retained power for two years, when Valencia was besieged by the Almoravids; although the king Alfonso VI of Castile drove them from the city, he was not strong enough to hold it. The Christians set fire to it, abandoned it, and the Almoravid Masdali took possession of it on 5 May 1109.

=== Diocese of Valencia (1238–1492) ===
James the Conqueror, with an army composed of French, English, Germans, and Italians, laid siege to Valencia in 1238, and on 28 September of that year forced a surrender. 50,000 Moors left the city and on 9 October the king, followed by his retinue and army, took possession. The principal mosque was turned into a church, Mass was celebrated, and the Te Deum sung.

The see was re-established, ten parishes being formed in the city; the Knights Templar and Hospitallers who had helped in the conquest, also Dominicans, Franciscans, Augustinians, Mercedarians, and Cistercians, opened houses. The Church of Sant Vincent outside the walls was rebuilt and beside it a hospital.

The consecration of the Dominican Berenguer de Castellbisbal, bishop-elect of the See of Valencia after the reconquest, was prevented because of the dispute between the Archbishops of Toledo and Tarragona for jurisdiction over the new see. Pope Gregory IX decided in favour of Tarragona, and, as Berenguer had been appointed Bishop of Girona in the meantime, Ferrer de Sant Martí, provost of Tarragona (1239–43), was appointed Bishop of Valencia.

He was succeeded by the Aragonese Arnau de Peralta (1243–48) who drove the Bishop of Segovia, Pedro Garcés, from his see. The third bishop of Valencia, the Dominican Andreu d'Albalat (1248–76), founder of the Carthusian monastery, began the construction of the cathedral; this was continued and finished by his successors: Jaspert de Botonach, Abbot of San Felin (1276–88); the Aragonese Dominican, Raimundo de Pont (1288–1312); the Catalan Ramón Gastó (1312–48); Hug de Fenolet, formerly Bishop of Vic (1348–56); and Vidal de Blanes (1356–69).

Jaume of Prades and Foix, Bishop of Tortosa and first cousin of king Peter IV, succeeded to the see in 1369. Hitherto the chapter had elected the bishops, but owing to the dissensions at the death of Bishop Vidal de Blanes, Pope Urban IV reserved the right to name the bishops until 1523, when the right of presentation was granted to the Spanish kings.

At the death of Jaume of Prades (1396), the antipope Benedict XIII kept the see vacant for more than two years, and then appointed Hugo de Lupia, Bishop of Tortosa (1398–1427). He was succeeded by Alfonso de Borja (then Pope Callixtus III). The latter appointed Rodrigo de Borja (then Pope Alexander VI) to the See of Valencia.

=== Archdiocese of Valencia (since 1492) ===
Rodrigo de Borja obtained from Pope Innocent VIII the rank of metropolitan for his see (1492) and, after he was raised to the papacy (Pope Alexander VI), confirmed this decree. He also raised the studium generale of Valencia to the rank of a university, conferring upon it all the privileges possessed by other universities.

César Borgia bore the title of Archbishop of Valencia, and was succeeded by Juan de Borja y Llansol, Pedro Luis de Borja, and Alfonso de Aragón, illegitimate son of Ferdinand the Catholic and also Archbishop of Saragossa (1512–1520).

The episcopate of the Augustinian St. Thomas of Villanova (1544–55), founder of the Colegio de la Presentación de Nuestra Señora, called also Colegio de Santo Tomás, was one of the most notable in the history of Valencia. St. Thomas was beatified (1619) by Pope Paul V, and canonized (1658) by Pope Alexander VII. His successors, Francisco de Navarra y Hualde and Martín Pérez de Ayala, who attended the Council of Trent, were also men of distinction.

Perhaps the most noted of all the archbishops of Valencia was the Patriarch Juan de Ribera (1569–1611). He decided to expel the Moors from the city, after exhausted all possible means to bring them to submission. He founded the Colegio de Corpus Christi and furthered the work of monastic reform, especially among the Capuchins, whom he had brought to Valencia.

Many holy men shed lustre upon this era, including Saint Louis Bertram, the Franciscan Nicolás Factor, the Carmelite Francisco de Niño Jesús, and the Minim Gaspar Bono. The archbishop and inquisitor general, Juan Tomás Rocaberti, publicly punished the Governor of Valencia for interfering in ecclesiastical jurisdiction. Andrés Mayoral Alonso de Mella (1738–69) improved the system of charities and public instruction, founded the Colegio de las Escuelas Pías, and the Casa de Enseñanza for girls. He collected a library of 12,000 volumes; this was burnt in the War of Independence.

== Bishops of Valencia (6th century – c. 712) ==
All the names in italics are given in Spanish:

- c. 540: Justinianus — (c. 531 – after 546)
- c. 587: Celsino — (c. 587 – Mentioned in 589)
  - c. 589: Ubiligisclo (Arian) — (Mentioned in 589)
- 6th century: San Eutropio
- c. 610: Marino — (Mentioned in 610)
- c. 635: Mustacio — (Mentioned between 633 and 638)
- c. 646: Anesio — (Mentioned in 646)
- c. 655: Félix — (Mentioned between 653 and 656)
- c. 675: Suintérico — (Mentioned in 675)
- c. 681: Hospitalio — (Mentioned in 681)
- c. 685: Sármata — (Mentioned between 683 and 688)
- c. 693: Witisclus (Spanish: Ubiticisclo) — (Mentioned in the Sixteenth Council of Toledo of 693)

Abd al-Aziz ibn Musa, son of Musa bin Nusair, took the city in c. 712.

== Bishops of Valencia (1094–1101) ==
El Cid (Rodrigo Díaz de Vivar) conquered Valencia in 1094.

- 10....–1094 : Zaet al-Matran
- 1096–1102 : Jerónimo de Périgord — (c. 1096 – 1102 ?)

In 1101 king Alfonso VI of Castile ordered the evacuation of Valencia, and the Almoravids took it.

== Bishops of Valencia (1238–1492) ==
King James the Conqueror took Valencia in 1238.

. . . . . . . . . . . . . . : Berenguer de Castellbisbal — (Elected, then Bishop of Girona in 1245–1254)

1. 1240–1243 : Ferrer de Pallarés (also Ferrer de San Martín)
2. 1243–1248 : Arnau de Peralta (also Arnaldo de Peralta)
3. 1248–1276 : Andreu d'Albalat (also Andrés Albalat)
4. 1276–1288 : Jaspert de Botonach (also Gasperto de Botonach, Abbot of Sant Feliu)
5. 1289–1312 : Ramón Despont (also Raimundo de Pont, 1288–1312)
6. 1312–1348 : Ramón de Gastó (also Raimundo Gastón)
7. 1348–1356 : Hug de Fenollet (also Hugo de Fenolet, formerly Bishop of Vic)
8. 1356–1369 : Vidal de Blanes
9. 1369–1396 : Jaume of Aragon — (Bishop of Tortosa in 1362–69 and first cousin of Peter IV)
  - 1396–1398 : See vacant
10. 1398–1427 : Hug de Llupià — (Bishop of Tortosa in 1379–1397)
11. 1429–1458 : Alfonso de Borja — (then Pope Callixtus III in 1455–1458)
12. 1458–1492 : Rodrigo de Borja — (then Pope Alexander VI in 1492–1503)

== Archbishops of Valencia (since 1492) ==
Rodrigo de Borja obtained from Pope Innocent VIII the rank of metropolitan for his see in 1492.

1. 1492–1503 : Rodrigo de Borja — (Pope Alexander VI in 1492–1503)
2. 1492–1498 : César Borja — (Archbishop Administrator, Arzobispo Administrador)
3. 1499–1500 : Juan de Borja Lanzol de Romaní, el menor — (Archbishop Administrator, Arzobispo Administrador)
4. 1500–1511 : Pedro Luis de Borja Lanzol de Romaní — (1500–1503 Archbishop Administrator, Arzobispo Administrador, 1503–1511 Archbishop)
5. 1512–1520 : Alonso de Aragón (or Alfonso de Aragón), illegitimate son of Ferdinand the Catholic and also Archbishop of Saragossa in 1478–1520.
6. 1520–1538 : Érard de La Marck
7. 1538–1544 : Jorge de Austria
8. 1544–1555 : Saint Tomás de Villanueva (otherwise Saint Thomas of Villanova)
9. 1556–1563 : Francisco de Navarra y Hualde
10. — –1564 : Acisclo de Moya y Contreras
11. 1564–1566 : Martín Pérez de Ayala
12. 1567–1568 : Fernando de Loaces y Pérez
13. 1569–1611 : Saint Juan de Ribera
14. 1612–1648 : Isidoro Aliaga
15. 1649–1658 : Pedro Urbina Montoya
16. 1659–1666 : Martín López de Ontiveros
17. 1667–1668 : Ambrosio Ignacio Spínola y Guzmán
18. 1668–1676 : Luis Alfonso de los Cameros
19. 1676–1699 : Juan Tomás de Rocaberti (also Inquisitor General)
20. 1700–1724 : Antonio Folc de Cardona
21. 1725–1736 : Andrés de Orbe y Larreátegui
22. 1738–1769 : Andrés Mayoral Alonso de Mella
23. 1770–1772 : Tomás de Azpuru
24. 1773–1794 : Francisco Fabián y Fuero
25. — –1795 : Antonio Despuig y Dameto
26. 1796–1800 : Juan Francisco Jiménez del Río
27. 1800–1813 : Joaquín Company Soler
28. 1815–1824 : Veremundo Arias Teixeiro y Rodríguez
29. 1824–1831 : Simón López y García
30. 1832–1848 : Joaquín López y Sicilia
31. 1848–1860 : Pablo García Abella
32. 1861–1876 : Cardinal Mariano Barrio Fernández
33. 1877–1892 : Antolín Monescillo y Viso
34. 1892–1898 : Ciriaco María Sancha y Hervás
35. 1898–1903 : Sebastián Herrero y Espinosa de los Monteros
36. 1904–1905 : Bernardino Nozaleda y Villa
37. 1906–1914 : Victoriano Guisasola y Menendez, became cardinal later
38. 1914–1916 : Valeriano Menéndez Conde y Álvarez
39. 1917–1919 : José María Salvador y Barrera
40. 1920–1923 : Enrique Reig y Casanova, became cardinal later
41. 1923–1945 : Prudencio Melo y Alcalde
42. 1946–1966 : Marcelino Olaechea y Loizaga
43. 1969–1978 : José María García Lahiguera
44. 1978–1992 : Miguel Roca Cabanellas
45. 1992–2009 : Agustín García-Gasco y Vicente, became cardinal later
46. 2009–2014 : Carlos Osoro Sierra, became cardinal later
47. 2014–2022 : Antonio Cañizares Llovera
48. 2022–present : Enrique Benavent Vidal

== See also ==
- List of the Roman Catholic dioceses of Spain.
- Valencia Cathedral

== Sources ==
- (in Spanish) IBERCRONOX: Obispado y Arzobispado de Valencia (Valentia)
