= Kinkead =

Kinkead is a surname. Notable people with the surname include:

- Alice Sarah Kinkead (1871–1926), Irish artist
- Charles Kinkead (1913–2007), Jamaican photojournalist
- Eleanor Talbot Kinkead (fl. 1800s), American novelist
- Emily Kinkead, American politician
- Eugene F. Kinkead (1876–1960), American politician
- Eugene Kinkead (writer) (1906–1992), American journalist
- George B. Kinkead (1811–1877), American lawyer
- John Henry Kinkead (1826–1904), American politician
- Katharine T. Kinkead (1910–2001), American journalist
- Maeve Kinkead (born 1946), American actress
- Robert Kinkead (1952–2019), American chef
- Samuel Kinkead (1897–1928), South African aviator

== See also ==
- Kincade (disambiguation)
- Kincaid (disambiguation)
- Kinkade, surname
- Kinkead's, restaurant
