= John Doe Indictment =

Legal strategy to apprehend unknown rapists

Indictment for John Doe #103, later identified as Kenneth Edmond

A John Doe Indictment, also referred to as a John Doe Warrant or a No-Name Warrant, is an indictment, criminal complaint or arrest warrant served using only a criminal's DNA. The strategy was popularized by Wisconsin District Attorney Norman Gahn in 1999 to serve warrants for suspects who have not been identified by name, but have been by DNA. The strategy has been attributed to the alteration of statute of limitations laws for sex crimes in multiple states.

== Methodology ==
When a rape or sexual assault occurs, the investigators collect DNA samples and store them in a rape kit. If the state the investigation takes place in has a statute of limitations against rape, the investigators will obtain an indictment, or a criminal complaint depending on state law, and an arrest warrant based on the DNA collected in the rape kit before the limitation runs out. This would override the statute of limitations, since a arrest warrant does not expire. The complaint officially identifies the subject as a John Doe, and lists the variable number tandem repeat values of their DNA. The investigators can then test the DNA against the Combined DNA Index System (CODIS), a national database of DNA collected from felons. If the perpetrator has committed another felony, their DNA will be entered into the database and match the complaint, often called a "cold hit". If the DNA is not in the database, investigators will check it periodically in case it is added. Once the perpetrator is identified, the complaint is amended to include their name. The method is typically used for sex crimes, but has been adapted to other crimes.

== History ==
While Norman Gahn popularized John Doe indictments, he was not the first to issue one. The first John Doe indictment was issued in Kansas by McPherson County District Attorney Ty Kaufman on March 13, 1991.

In 1998, Wisconsin's Sensitive Crimes Division was dissatisfied with the statute of limitations expiring on violent sex crimes. At the time, DNA examination was new in the United States. The investigators took DNA from fifty-three rape cases whose limitations were about the expire and tested them against a database. At the time, Wisconsin had a six year statute of limitations so they checked cases from 1992 to 1994. Investigators found that of the fifty-three, eight cases matched convicts who were in the database for separate crimes. One of the samples matched a convict who was incarcerated in Wisconsin for a separate rape. He was charged eight hours before the limitation expired. Three samples matched a serial rapist who was incarcerated in Minnesota on separate charges, who was subsequently charged with the three rapes. thirteen of the samples matched other samples, implying repeat offenders.

The first John Doe indictment was filed in September 1999. District Attorney Norman Gahn filed a criminal complaint using three matching DNA samples from rapes and robberies in February, April, and November 1993. The complaint identified him as "John Doe, unknown male," with matching DNA at "genetic locations D1S7, D2S44, D5S110, D10S28 and D17S79." The complaint only included the November rape since the statute of limitations had already ran out on the first two. As of December 31, 2026, the case remains open, but if he is caught, he faces charges of first-degree sexual assault and kidnapping. One of the warrants, filed in 2000, was for a man who broke into a woman's house, raped her, and locked her in the trunk of her car in 1994. The warrant identified him as "John Doe #4". In 2007, the DNA was matched to a man named Mackenzie Burse, who was charged with the crime. Another warrant was filed against a man who forced a 7-year-old girl behind a house and raped her in 1994. The complaint identifies him as "John Doe, unknown male, with matching deoxyribonucleic acid [DNA] at genetic locations D2S44, D4S139, D5S110, D10S28, D1S7 and D17S79." The case remains open, but if he is caught, he faces charges of rape and kidnapping. Between 1999 and 2000, Gahn issued sixteen warrants for John Does on sex crimes, By 2002, he had issued twenty-four. All of the warrants were allowed by the court of Wisconsin. On February 6, 2002, Bobby Dabney became the first person arrested and convicted using a John Doe indictment. On January 1, 2001, California amended Penal Code § 803(g) to suspend the statute of limitations for a year after DNA is matched to a perpetrator. On September 1, 2001, during the Dabney trial, Wisconsin passed Wis. Stat. sec. 939.74(2d) (b), to similar effect. Other states would pass similar laws.

On March 15, 2000, Manhattan District Attorney Robert Morgenthau issued the first John Doe indictment in the state of New York. Morgenthau indicted Joseph James DeAngelo, known at the time as the Eastside Rapist, using his DNA. DeAngelo would be apprehended by Sacramento County Sheriff's Office on August 24, 2018. Morgenthau would issue other indictments in the years following. In 2001, he issued an indictment for a man who raped a woman on a subway. The man was later identified as David Martinez and sentenced to sixteen years to life. On October 22, 2004, Morgenthau also issued an indictment against a man who raped and stabbed a woman on October 23, 1994. The DNA was later matched with Johnny Boone, who was charged with the crime. In October 2002, Brooklyn District Attorney Charles J. Hynes filed the first John Doe indictment in Brooklyn, New York. The indictment was for two rapes that took place on October 25, 1995, and November 18, 1995. On January 30, 2003, the DNA was matched to Alex Virella, whose DNA was added into CODIS in December 2002 after a 1996 armed robbery. Virella was arrested for the crime on February 21, 2003, and was held on $50,000 bail. He was convicted on one count of rape in the first degree on March 19, 2003, and entered into the sex offender registry. Hynes would later serve a total of twenty-three John Doe indictments, two of which would be matched to Tyrone Fleetwood, and Intzar Hussain.

On August 21, 2000, Sacramento District Attorney Laurie Earl issued the first John Doe indictment in California. The man was later identified as Paul Robinson and was sentenced to sixty-five years in prison.

On May 14, 2002, the 107th United States Congress introduced the DNA Sexual Assault Justice Act of 2002. The bill, sponsored by Joe Biden and Maria Cantwell, sought to eliminate the backlog of unexamined rape kits through grants. During the considerations, the District Attorney of DeKalb County, Georgia, Tom Morgan, testified to the reliability of DNA in issuing warrants, mentioning the Wisconsin warrants. Section 10 of the act approved the constitutionality of John Doe Indictments. While the bill would pass in the senate, it would not be approved in the house. However, the bill would later evolve into the Justice For All Act, passed on October 30, 2004.

On August 4, 2003, at-the-time Mayor of New York City Michael Bloomberg announced the John Doe Indictment Project, a state-wide project dedicated to proactively reviewing cold rape cases, and issuing indictments using the DNA. The project received $347,725 in funding from the National Institute of Justice, and led to the reexamination of six-hundred 1994 rape cases. One of the cases reexamined was the case of Natasha Alexenko, a woman who was raped and robbed in 1993, and the founder of Natasha's Justice Project. In 2003, an indictment was issued for her rapist based on his DNA. In 2007, the DNA was matched to Victor Rondon, whose DNA was entered into CODIS after he assaulted a police officer. In 2008, Rondon was convicted on eight counts of physical assault and two counts of rape. He was sentenced to serve between forty-four and one-hundred seven years in prison.

In September 2004, DuPage County District Attorney Joseph Birkett issued the first John Doe indictments in Illinois. Birkett issued ten indictments, eight for burglary and two for sexual assault. Three of the burglaries had a match. As of 2012, Illinois had issued forty John Doe indictments.

Gahn has received multiple awards for his work. In 2015, the Federal Bureau of Investigation awarded Gahn the Allied Professional Award for his work on the cases, calling him "a pioneer in DNA technology in the courtroom." Also, in 2015, the State Bar of Wisconsin awarded Gahn the first Lifetime Legal Innovator Award.

In October 2020, the Cuyahoga County Prosecutors Office commissioned the Genetic Operations Linking DNA Unit, or the G.O.L.D Unit. The G.O.L.D Unit is a project dedicated to investigating rape cold cases and issuing indictments based on the DNA. The project is funded by the Department of Justice Sexual Assault Kit Initiative. As of 2020, the Cuyahoga County Prosecutor's Office had issued one-hundred eighty-one John Doe indictments. As of March 26, 2025, the project had led to the closure of twenty-three rape cases.

== Notable cases ==
=== Douglas Belt ===
Between March 25, 1989 and August 17, 1994, a man known as the I-70 rapist raped six women in Kansas. Belt would break into his victims houses, and hold them at knifepoint. Belt would then blindfold them, bind their wrists with duct-tape, and rape them. In some cases, Belt would cut them.

On March 13, 1991, McPherson County District Attorney Ty Kaufman issued an indictment using his DNA. The indictment was for a March 25, 1989 rape where a man broke into a woman's house, bound and blindfolded her, and raped her. The indictment charged him with one count of rape, two counts of aggravated sodomy, one count of aggravated burglary, and one count of aggravated kidnapping. Multiple more complaints were filed as DNA would link him to more attacks. By 1997, six different complaints had been filed across McPherson County, Saline County, and Reno County. Investigators matched the DNA to Douglas Belt in June 2002 after he was arrested for the rape and murder of Lucille Gallegos. The complaints were amended to include Belt's name in 2003. Police had initially investigated Belt in March 1991 after the first attack. Belt gave investigators a DNA sample and it did not match. However, it was discovered the Kansas Bureau of Investigation had mislabelled Belt's DNA, labelling it as "unknown", leading to someone else's DNA being tested against the DNA from the complaint.

On October 4, 2005, Belt moved to have the McPherson complaints dismissed, arguing the complaints were too vague and that too much time had passed since the complaints and his arrests. Judge Richard Walker dismissed the charges on the basis that the KBI's mislabelling of Belt's DNA constituted an "act of official negligence. However, Walker upheld the constitutionality of John Doe indictments. On December 2, 2005, Belt successfully had the Saline warrants dismissed. Judge Dan Boyer ruled that the warrant had violated his 6th Amendment rights. In Reno, the state ruled that the warrants did not properly identify Belt, and that the statute of limitations had run out, dismissing the charges. On March 28, 2008, the Supreme Court of Kansas affirmed the dismissals.

=== Paul Robinson ===
Starting on August 24, 1994, a man raped five women in Sacramento, California. The man was referred to as "The Second Story Rapist" because he exclusively victimized women living on the second floor of apartment buildings. In one of the rapes, he broke into a woman's house early in the morning, climbed on top of her, held her at knifepoint, held a pillow over her face, and raped her.

On August 21, 2000, District Attorney of Sacramento Laurie Earl issued a criminal complaint, using the DNA, charging the man with five counts of sexual assault. The next day Detective Peter Willover filed an arrest warrant using the DNA. The warrant was approved in Sacramento County Superior Court by Judge Jane Ure. On September 15, 2000, the DNA was matched to a man named Paul Robinson. Robinson's DNA entered the states databank on March 2, 1999, after a 1994 spousal Abuse charge. Robinson had priors for parole violation and loitering. The warrant was amended to include Robinson's name, and Robinson was arrested at a relative's house later that day.

On February 23, 2001, Robinson's defense moved to have his case dismissed, arguing the warrant did not properly describe him, the statute of limitations had passed, and that they had violated his 4th amendment rights. Robinson's defense argued that his DNA should not have been in the databank, since the spousal abuse charge was a misdemeanor, and DNA can only be collected after felony charges under California law. While the court agreed the DNA extraction was a mistake, they refused to exclude it on the basis that the mistake was made in good faith. In 2003, a jury convicted Robinson on one count of forcible oral copulation, two counts of penetration with a foreign object, and two counts of rape. Robinson was sentenced to sixty-five years in prison. Robinson appealed the decision to the third appellate district of the Court of Appeal of the State of California, which was denied on October 26, 2007. On January 25, 2010, the Supreme Court of California denied a second appeal in a 5-2 decision. Robinson is the first person to be arrested, tried, and convicted on a John Doe indictment in California, and the first person to be arrested on one in the United States.

=== Bobby Dabney Jr. ===
In Milwaukee, Wisconsin, on December 7, 1994, a 15-year-old girl named Dawana was waiting for her bus when a man pulled a gun on her and began hitting her on the head. The man told her to "shut up" and forced her to a secluded area. The man pulled her hat over her eyes and said, "don't put your hat up on your head cause I'll shoot." He forced her into his car. Once inside, he drove to another location, undressed her, and threatened to kill her if she did not have sex with him. After she did what he wanted, he drove around for a while, before letting her leave. Dawana found a phone and called her mother, who called the police. On March 30, 1995, Wisconsin's crime lab ingested semen samples from the perpetrator left on the victim.

On December 4, 2000, three days before the statute of limitations was going to expire, Norman Gahn issued an criminal complaint using the DNA. The complaint identified the perpetrator as "John Doe #12," and charged him with one count of kidnapping and four counts of sexual assault in the first degree. A circuit court judge approved the complaint and issued an arrest warrant. On February 17, 2001, the sample was matched to Bobby Dabney Jr., whose DNA was entered into CODIS after a 1996 armed robbery. Dabney also had two other sexual assault convictions. On March 14, 2001, the warrant was amended to include Dabney's name. Investigators also linked Dabney to another rape. The victim of that rape later spoke at Dabney's trial.

On April 12, 2001, Dabney's case was bound over to Milwaukee Circuit Court. On June 22, 2001, Gabney's defense moved to have the charges dismissed, arguing the attorney did not have sufficient information to indict him, and that they violated his 6th Amendment rights. On August 31, 2001, the court upheld the charges under the basis that a warrant can be issued for an unknown person as long as the suspect can be identified with "reasonable certainty." On September 13, 2001, Dabney's defense filed a petition for leave to appeal, which would allow a higher court to review the circuit courts decision. The petition was denied. Dabney's defense also requested a pre-trial review, which was also denied. On February 6, 2002, the case went to trial. Dabney waived his right to a jury. Dabney was found guilty of one count of kidnapping, and two counts of sexual assault in the first degree. Judge Jeffrey Wagner sentenced Dabney to three forty year prison sentences, which would be served consecutively.

Dabney appealed the decision to the Court of Appeals of Wisconsin, who decided to uphold the decision on April 29, 2003. Dabney became the first person to be arrested, tried, and convicted using a John Doe indictment.

=== Rodney Washington ===
Between March 27, 1994 and January 14, 1995, a man raped five women between the ages of fourteen and twenty in Milwaukee. The man would approach the victims in the street, threaten that he had a gun, take them to secluded areas, and rape them. He would also steal items from the victims, such as loose change or a jacket. On March 16, 2000, Norman Gahn issued an criminal complaint charging "Doe, John #5, Unknown No. 16-3253 3 Male with Matching Deoxyribonucleic Acid (DNA) Profile at Genetic Locations D1S7, D2S44, D4S139, D5S110, D10S28, and D17S79." The complaint charged him with four counts of sexual assault in the first degree, one count of sexual assault in the second degree, and three counts of robbery. On June 25, 2007, the DNA was matched to Illinois local Rodney Washington. Washington had a criminal record spanning from 1978 to 2007, for charges like rape, robbery and drug possession. His DNA entered CODIS on June 1, 2007 after a drug possession charge. The complaint was amended to include Washington's name, and he was arraigned on September 10, 2007.

Washington appeared for a preliminary hearing where four of his victims testified. Before the hearing was over, Washington waived his right to a preliminary hearing, skipping it entirely. Washington was initially assigned a public defender, who argued that the DNA was unreliable due to the age, the way it was analyzed, and contamination. Washington said he did not wish to be represented by a public defender, and said if his defense did not move to dismiss the charges before the first hearing on February 14, 2008, he would go pro se, representing himself. When his defense did not drop the charges, he requested to go pro se at the February 14, 2008 hearing, although he would later change his mind. On April 28, 2008, Washington would make another request to go pro se. The request was denied on the basis that the trial relied mainly on DNA evidence, which Washington was not qualified to dispute. On June 11, 2008, Washington was found guilty of four counts of sexual assault in the first degree, and three counts of sexual assault of a minor in the second degree. His case was decided by a jury that only took two hours to reach a decision. On July 7, 2008, Judge Jeffrey Wagner sentenced Washington to one-hundred years in prison. Washington would appeal the decision, but the Wisconsin Court of Appeals upheld the decision on March 26, 2013.

On March 8, 2018, the United States Court of Appeals for the Seventh Circuit overturned Washington's conviction. Washington argued the conviction violated Faretta v. California, which ruled a court cannot force a defense upon a defendent based on their intelligence. The court agreed. Washington also argued the warrant did not identify him with reasonable certainty, which the court rejected. The district attorney was given ninety days to retry him, or he had to be released. Washington was retried in a trial where he represented himself, and reconvicted. On January 20, 2021, Washington appealed the second conviction to the Wisconsin Court of Appeals, which was denied.

=== David Martinez ===
On October 31, 1996, a man held a woman on a subway at gunpoint. The man forced the woman to give him her money, and undress herself, at which point he attempted, and failed, to rape her. The man told her, "this is what happens to women who take the train alone at night". It has been alleged he had two accomplices who served as lookouts, but this was never confirmed. In October 2002, A DNA sample was collected from the victim, but an investigation did not turn up a suspect at the time. In 2001, a grand jury indicted the man on one count of attempted rape in the first degree, three counts of sexual abuse in the first degree, and two counts of robbery in the first degree using the DNA. On October 12, 2004, the DNA was matched to David Martinez, whose DNA was entered into CODIS in August 2004 after a 1999 drug possession charge in New Jersey. Martinez had a prior for armed robbery in New Jersey. The indictment was amended to include Martinez's name.

On December 16, 2004, Martinez's defense moved to have the indictment dismissed on the basis it did not properly describe him, and that the statute of limitations had expired. The motion was denied on January 26, 2005. Martinez ended up pleading guilty, and was convicted on attempted rape in the first degree. He was sentenced to sixteen years to life. Martinez appealed the decision to the first department of the Supreme Court of New York Appellate Division, which was overruled on April 17, 2008. Martinez became the first man convicted on a John Doe Indictment in Manhattan, New York.

=== 1984 Connecticut Serial Rapist ===
Between June and July 1984, a man raped four women in Connecticut. The man would cut the phone lines to the houses he targeted. After the lines were cut, he would hold the women at gunpoint, blindfold them, and rape them. The man would then take possessions from the house, and eat out of their fridge before leaving. Despite police setting up a task force of eighteen members dedicated to solving the case, nothing ever came of the investigation.

On November 24, 2004, Chief State Attorney of Connecticut Christopher Morano issued an arrest warrant for the man based on his DNA. The warrant identified him as "John Doe #1", and charged him with four counts of kidnapping with a firearm in the first degree. They could not charge him with sexual assault since the statute of limitations had already run out. The warrant was approved by Superior Court of Connecticut Judge Elpedio Vitale, who set the bail at $1,000,000. Governor of Connecticut Jodi Rell offered a $50,000 reward to anyone who could offer information that would lead to an arrest. They set up an anonymous twenty-four hour tipline for any leads. The man has not been caught, but if he is he faces charges of kidnapping. This was the first John Doe indictment served in the state of Connecticut.

=== Juan Colás Death Threats ===
On September 14, 2012, Dane County District Judge Juan Colás made a ruling striking down sections of Act 10. The decision was highly controversial and Colás received hate mail after the ruling. Starting October 10, 2012, Colás received two letters from the same person threatening his life. The first letter was enclosed with a newspaper clipping from the Los Angeles Times reporting the assassinations of two Mexican judges and implied the same would happen to Colás. The second came enclosed with a denture's advertisement subtitled "missing teeth". The letter went on to say "You sir are nothing but an obstruction to the law — you sir are expendable...Sometimes radical steps are required to repair our laws + [sic] our idiots sitting on a bench supposedly dispensing justice." The letters were investigated by authorities who took saliva from the stamps. Investigators linked the DNA on the stamp to threatening letters sent to other Wisconsin judges in 2012 and 2013.

On October 8, 2018, the Wisconsin Department of Justice filed an indictment using the DNA collected from the letter. He has never been identified, but if he is he faces charges of threatening a judge. This is a rare case of a John Doe indictment being used for a non-violent crime.

=== D.C.-Area Hotel Rapist ===
Between August 22, 1998 and February 6, 2006, a man raped at least six women in the Washington, D.C. area. The man has become known as the D.C.-Area Hotel Rapist, since he would break into hotels and rape housekeepers.

On May 1, 2018, District Attorney of Columbia Jessie Liu issued an indictment for the D.C.-Area Hotel Rapist based on his DNA. The indictment charged him on two counts of assault. This was the first time the district issued a John Doe Indictment. The case remains open.

== Criticism ==
Some defense lawyers and civil liberties advocacy groups have opposed the use of John Doe indictments. Defense lawyer Richard Ney referred to John Doe indictments as "legal fiction" and called them "inherently unfair". Johnny Griffin, one of Paul Robinson's defense lawyers, told CNN, "I think the Supreme Court is going to rule that you can't [sic] do it." On May 1, 2004, the National Association of Criminal Defense Lawyers made a statement disavowing John Doe indictments, arguing degraded DNA samples can lead to false positives, and that it gives defendants an unfair disadvantage. Lawrence Goldman of the National Association of Criminal Defense Lawyers argued the method only proves a sex act occurred but does not prove the context. On February 26, 2007, the New York Civil Liberties Union opposed the passing of a bill that would support John Doe indictments, citing concerns about due process rights, and method of DNA collection.

== In popular culture ==
In season 1, episode 14 of Law & Order: Special Victims Unit, "Limitations", SVU tries and fails to obtain a John Doe Indictment on a serial rapist who is about to get away with three 1995 rapes. The strategy is referred to as the "Wisconsin maneuver".
