= Kincaid (surname) =

Kincaid or Kinkaid is a Scottish surname.

Notable people with the surname include:

- Alexander Kincaid (1710–1777), Scottish printer and publisher who served as Lord Provost of Edinburgh
- Angela Kincaid, British children's book illustrator
- April Kincaid (born 1976), American professional wrestler and model
- Aron Kincaid (1940–2011), American voice actor
- Bradley Kincaid (1895–1989), American folk singer and radio entertainer
- Charles Augustus Kincaid (1870–1954), British administrator in India, co-author of The History of the Maratha People
- Cliff Kincaid (born 1954), American investigative journalist
- Dalton Kincaid (born 1999), American football player
- Dave Kincaid (born 1957), Irish-American singer, musician and songwriter who co-founded the Brandos
- Doug Kincaid (born 1962), American puppeteer
- D. Lawrence Kincaid (born 1945), American social scientist and proponent of the Convergence Model of Communication
- Harrison R. Kincaid (1836–1920), American politician
- Hilda Kincaid (1886–1967), Australian medical practitioner
- Jamaica Kincaid (born 1949), Antiguan-American novelist
- James R. Kincaid, American author
- Sir John Kincaid (1787–1862), Scottish army officer
- John G. Kincaid, co-founder of the former British marine engine manufacturer John G. Kincaid & Company
- J. Peter Kincaid (born 1942), American scientist and educator
- Keith Kinkaid (born 1989), American ice hockey player
- Lloyd H. Kincaid (1925–2007), American politician
- Matt Kincaid, Northern Irish paramilitary leader
- Nanci Kincaid, American novelist
- Robert Kincaid (1832–1920), Ontario politician
- Thomas Kincaid (1661–1726), Scottish diarist, golfer and archer
- Thomas C. Kinkaid (1888–1972), American admiral
- Tim Kincaid (born 1944), American pornographic film director
- Trevor Kincaid (1872–1970), Canadian-American biologist
- Wally Kincaid (1926–2015), American basketball coach
- William Kincaid (artist) (born 1957), American painter
- William Kincaid (flutist) (1895–1967), American flutist
- William W. Kincaid (1868–1940s), American businessman

Fictional characters with the surname include:

- Billy Kincaid, a character of the Spawn comic book series published by Image Comics
- Chet Kincaid, from the TV show The Bill Cosby Show, portrayed by Bill Cosby
- Claire Kincaid, an Assistant District Attorney in Law & Order, played by Jill Hennessy
- Claudia Kincaid and Jamie Kincaid, protagonists of From the Mixed-Up Files of Mrs. Basil E. Frankweiler by E. L. Konigsburg
- Darius Kincaid, from the movie "The Hitman's Bodyguard”, played by Samuel L. Jackson
- Ellen Kincaid, from the mini series Hollywood, portrayed by Holland Taylor
- Jared Kincaid, from The Dresden Files book series
- James Mitchell "Jimmy" Kincaid, an elven detective from the Shadowrun novel series
- Keith Kincaid, from the movie Bowfinger, portrayed by Eddie Murphy
- Liam Kincaid, from the TV show Earth: Final Conflict
- Marcus Kincaid, from the game Borderlands
- Mr. Kincaid, from the game Pokémon Ranger: Shadows of Almia
- Paul Kincaid, US President from the TV series Hostages, portrayed by James Naughton
- Reuben Kincaid, from the TV show The Partridge Family
- Roland Kincaid, from the movie A Nightmare on Elm Street 3: Dream Warriors
- Ryle Kincaid, character in author Colleen Hoover's novel It Ends with Us

== See also ==
- Kinkade
- Kinkaid
