= Debbie Smith Act =

United States federal criminal legislation

Debbie Smith Act of 2014

Citations
- Public law: Pub. L. 108–405 (text) (PDF)

Codification
- Acts amended: DNA Identification Act of 1994, Violence Against Women Act of 2000, DNA Analysis Backlog Elimination Act of 2000, Uniform Code of Military Justice
- U.S.C. sections created: 42 U.S.C. § 13701

Legislative history
- Introduced in the House as H.R. 5107 (Justice for All Act of 2004) by Jim Sensenbrenner (R–WI) on September 21, 2004; Committee consideration by House Committee on the Judiciary; Passed the House on October 6, 2004 (393–14); Passed the Senate on October 9, 2004 (Unanimous consent); Signed into law by President George W. Bush on October 30, 2004

The Debbie Smith Act of 2004 (42 U.S.C. § 13701) provides United States federal government grants to eligible states and units of local government to conduct DNA analyses of backlogged DNA samples collected from victims of crimes and criminal offenders. The Act expands the Combined DNA Index System (CODIS) and provides legal assistance to survivors of dating violence. Named after sexual assault survivor Debbie Smith, the Act was passed by the 108th Congress as part of larger legislation, the Justice for All Act of 2004 (Pub. L. 108–405 (text) (PDF)), and signed into law by President George W. Bush on October 30, 2004. The Act amended the DNA Analysis Backlog Elimination Act of 2000 (42 U.S.C. § 14135), the DNA Identification Act of 1994 (42 U.S.C. § 14132), the Violence Against Women Act of 2000, and the Uniform Code of Military Justice. The Act was reauthorized in 2008, extending the availability of DNA backlog reduction program grants, DNA evidence training and education program grants, and sexual assault forensic exam program grants through fiscal year 2014.

== Debbie Smith ==
On March 3, 1989, a man wearing a ski mask entered Debbie Smith's home in Williamsburg, Virginia, threatened her with a gun, dragged her into the woods, blindfolded her, and raped her repeatedly over the next hour. Smith participated in the collection of DNA evidence for a rape kit, but it was neither formally tested nor entered into a national database until 1994.

On July 24, 1995, a DNA technician identified Debbie's attacker, Norman Jimmerson, while analyzing various DNA records. Jimmerson, then serving time for abducting and robbing two women in 1989, was sentenced to 161 years in prison under the three strikes law.

== Provisions of the Act ==
The Act attempts to eliminate backlogs of DNA samples collected from crime victims and criminal offenders, to expand the number and type of samples included in the Combined DNA Index System (CODIS), and to provide legal assistance to survivors of dating violence. The Act amends the DNA Analysis Backlog Elimination Act of 2000 (42 U.S.C. 14135) to reauthorize and broaden the number of eligible grantees under the Debbie Smith DNA Backlog Grant Program. The Act expands eligible grantees to include local units of government and authorizes the appropriation of $151,000,000 each year for fiscal years 2005 through 2009 to states and local units of government to conduct DNA analyses of backlogged DNA samples collected from victims and criminal offenders. Under the Act, the Attorney General may award grants to eligible grantees to alleviate backlogs requiring a forensic science other than DNA analysis pending the state or local unit of government can certify that no significant backlog awaits DNA analysis and that there is no immediate need for laboratory equipment, supplies, or additional personnel to ensure the timely processing of future DNA evidence. The Act also amends the DNA Analysis Backlog Elimination Act of 2000 (42 U.S.C. 14135) to provide for the use of vouchers or contracts for laboratory services to assist in the reduction of backlogged DNA evidence.

The Act amends the DNA Identification Act of 1994 to provide for the inclusion of DNA samples collected from individuals charged in an indictment or information with a crime and individuals whose DNA samples are collected by proper legal authorities into the Combined DNA Index System (CODIS).

The Act amends the Violence Against Women Act of 2000 to broaden the type of survivors eligible for legal assistance to include survivors of dating violence.

== 2008 Reauthorization ==
The Debbie Smith Reauthorization Act of 2008 maintains previous appropriation levels for the Debbie Smith DNA Backlog Grant Program through 2014. The 2008 Reauthorization amends the DNA Analysis Backlog Elimination Act of 2000 by authorizing the appropriation of $151,000,000 each year for fiscal years 2009 through 2014 for grants to eligible states and local units of government to conduct DNA analyses of backlogged DNA samples collected from victims and criminal offenders.

The Reauthorization Act of 2008 amends the DNA Sexual Assault Justice Act of 2004 to extend DNA training and education grant programs for law enforcement, correctional personnel and court officers through 2014. The Act authorizes the appropriation of $12,500,000 each year for fiscal years 2009 through 2014 for training, technical assistance and education for law enforcement, correctional personnel and court officers regarding the identification, collection, preservation and analysis of DNA samples and evidence. The Act also maintains sexual assault forensic exam program grants through 2014, authorizing the appropriation of $30,000,000 each year for fiscal years 2009 through 2014. Eligible states, units of local government and sexual assault examination programs can apply for sexual assault forensic exam program grants for training, technical assistance and education regarding the identification, collection, preservation and analysis of DNA samples and evidence.

== 2014 Reauthorization ==
On March 27, 2014, Goodlatte introduced the Debbie Smith Reauthorization Act of 2014 (H.R. 4323; 113th Congress) into the House. The bill would amend the Debbie Smith Act of 2004 in order to reauthorize funding through Fiscal Year 2019 for the Debbie Smith DNA Backlog Grant Program, sexual assault forensic exam program grants, and DNA training and education for law enforcement, correctional personnel, and court officers. The bill would authorize the appropriation of $968 million over the 2015–2019 period. The grant program would go to the states to run programs to analyze DNA samples from crime victims. The House voted on April 7, 2014 to pass the bill in a voice vote.

Debbie Smith, who the law is named after, spoke in favor of the bill. She said that "these aren't rape kits that need to be tested, these are lives that need to be given back to their owners," arguing that the bill was very important to the victims of rape. Rep. Carolyn Maloney (D-NY) also spoke in favor of the bill, arguing that "this is one of those rare bills that virtually guarantees that it will put real criminals behind bars and protect people more effectively against one of the most traumatic assaults imaginable." Rep. Bob Goodlatte praised Debbie Smith's courage. He also said that he was "pleased that the House voted today to stand by these brave victims and ensure that DNA analysis is completed quickly so that law enforcement officials can accurately identify, prosecute, and lock these criminals in jail so that sexual predators are not left free to roam our streets and potentially hurt more women." He also urged the Senate to move quickly to pass the legislation.

== 2019 Reauthorization ==
In 2019, the Debbie Smith Reauthorization Act of 2019 was signed into law by Trump to provide funding to help eliminate backlogs in rape kit testing. More than 100,000 rape kits in the United States remain untested.

== Evaluations of Debbie Smith DNA Backlog Grant Program ==
Investigations conducted by CBS News and by Human Rights Watch have revealed that despite five years and millions in federal funding, rape kit backlogs persist in the United States and have increased in several grant supported states and counties. According to a 2009 CBS News investigation, at least 20,000 untested rape kits were being held in four major U.S. cities and an additional twelve major cities had no idea how many rape kits remained untested in law enforcement storage facilities. An October 2008 audit of the Los Angeles city crime lab by Human Rights Watch revealed that rape kit backlogs increased between 2004 and 2008, despite nearly $4 million in Debbie Smith DNA Backlog Program grants. In January 2007, the Los Angeles Police Department (LAPD) revealed that approximately 5,000 rape kits resided in LAPD storage facilities. By July 2008 the backlog grew to 7,300, but was later estimated at 5,193 by a February 2009 audit. According to ABC News, since 2004, the Debbie Smith Act has had some success with almost 200,000 sexual offenders identified, and over 40% of all DNA matches since 2005 were because of resources that became available because of grant money.

The National Institute of Justice (NIJ), the research arm of the U.S. Department of Justice, has also conducted research into the continued development of the DNA forensic evidence backlog. In their research, the NIJ tracked the processing of the two main types of DNA evidence: "casework" DNA and "convicted offender and arrestee" DNA. Casework DNA refers to DNA samples collected from crime scenes, victims and suspects in criminal cases, while convicted offender and arrestee DNA refers to samples taken in accordance with state and federal laws for entry into the Federal Bureau of Investigation's CODIS system. In a 2010 survey, the NIJ found that the nationwide casework DNA backlog exceeded 111,500 samples, a substantial increase over the 38,000 cases considered to be backlogged in a 2005 Bureau of Justice Statistics survey. Convicted offender and arrestee DNA samples have experienced even more substantial backlogging according to the NIJ, although there is a larger number of convicted offender and arrestee samples sent for processing. Regardless, a 2009 NIJ study found that the year-end backlog of convicted offender and arrestee samples had reached over 950,000 samples, the equivalent of almost an entire year's capacity for the nation's crime laboratories.

== See also ==
- Combined DNA Index System (CODIS)
- DNA Analysis Backlog Elimination Act of 2000
- Post-assault treatment of sexual assault victims
- Rape, Abuse & Incest National Network
- Violence Against Women Act of 2000
- Natasha's Justice Project
