= Thomas Kincaid (disambiguation) =

Thomas Kincaid (1661–1726) was a Scottish medical student, golfer, and archer who wrote early golf instructions.

Thomas Kincaid or Tom Kinkaid may also refer to:

- Tom Kincaid, a character in the 1933 film The Past of Mary Holmes
- Tommy Kincaid or Champ, a character in the 2007 film Resurrecting the Champ

== See also ==
- Kincaid (disambiguation)
- Tom Kincade (1887–1910), American race car driver
- Thomas Kinkade (1958–2012), American painter
- Thomas C. Kinkaid (1888–1972), admiral in the United States Navy during World War II
