= Kinkaid =

Kinkaid may refer to

- Kinkaid (surname)
- USS Kinkaid, a Spruance-class U.S. Navy destroyer
- Kinkaid Act of 1904, which applied to Western Nebraska, U.S.
- Kinkaid Formation, a geological formation in Illinois, U.S.
  - Kinkaid Lake in Illinois
  - Kinkaid Lake State Fish and Wildlife Area in Illinois
  - Kinkaid Township, Jackson County, Illinois
- Kinkaid, Nevada, a populated place in the United States
- The Kinkaid School in Texas, U.S.

== See also ==
- Kincaid (disambiguation)
