= Lisa Friel =

American lawyer

- Education: Dartmouth College; University of Virginia School of Law
- Occupations: Senior Vice President, Special Counsel for Investigations at the National Football League

Lisa M. Friel is a New York City lawyer and prosecutor. She formerly served as chief of the sex crimes unit in the Manhattan District Attorney's office.

== Career ==
Friel graduated from Dartmouth College with a degree in history, and from University of Virginia School of Law.

She began working for the Manhattan District Attorney's office in 1983, when she was hired by former Manhattan DA Robert Morgenthau. She became a specialist in sex crimes following her first rape case in 1986. In 1991, she became deputy of the Manhattan DA Sex Crimes Prosecution Unit under Linda Fairstein, and in 2002, she became the unit's chief following Fairstein's retirement. She served as chief of the sex crimes unit for almost ten years before resigning in 2011. Friel appeared in court in the case against former IMF director Dominique Strauss-Kahn, although she was not a member of the investigating team.

Friel also worked for T&M Protection Resources, a corporate security firm, as vice president of a division that investigated and consulted on sexual misconduct cases.

In 2007, Friel and the other bureau chiefs of the Sex Crimes Prosecution Units in the New York County District Attorney's office were honored by the Crime Victims Treatment Center of St. Luke's and Roosevelt Hospitals for their work in prosecuting sex offenders.

She was featured in "Sex Crimes Unit", a documentary aired on HBO.

She has been quoted in The New York Times and elsewhere about cases in which she was involved.

In April 2015, Friel became Senior Vice President/Special Counsel for Investigations for the National Football League. In this role, Friel investigated alleged violations of the NFL's personal conduct code including "domestic violence, sexual assault, animal cruelty, blackmail, extortion, racketeering, disorderly conduct". Friel's position was created following the NFL's mishandling of a case of assault by Baltimore Ravens running back Ray Rice. Following the case, Friel worked with the NFL in an advisory capacity to develop training, improve the league's personal conduct policy, and establish a baseline suspension period for specific violations including domestic violence, sexual assault and child abuse. She later joined the league full-time.

She has been described by her former boss, former New York prosecutor Linda Fairstein, as a "rabid Giants fan."

== Controversies ==
In her role as the NFL's special counsel for investigations, Friel headed an investigation that, on August 17, 2016, resulted in New York Giants placekicker Josh Brown receiving a one-game suspension instead of the league-mandated six-game suspension. The suspension was reduced by more than 83 percent because of mitigating circumstances that the league and Friel have never revealed. Coverage of the case noted that Friel was reported to be a Giants fan.

In her role as the NFL's special counsel for investigations she also oversaw the domestic violence investigation of Dallas Cowboys running back Ezekiel Elliott. In a lawsuit filed by the NFLPA, Friel is accused of withholding "critical information which would completely exonerate Elliott" in allegations of domestic violence. Friel reportedly barred lead investigator Kia Roberts, who recommended no suspension for Elliott, from attending a meeting with NFL commissioner Roger Goodell where Friel recommended a six-game suspension for Elliott to Goodell and other NFL executives. Friel was also accused of withholding evidence when she was implicated for prosecutorial misconduct in the alleged rape case of former New York police officers Kenneth Moreno and Franklin Mata.

== Personal life ==
Friel grew up in Haworth, New Jersey as the oldest of three daughters. Her father was a garment manufacturer and her mother was a homemaker. Friel graduated from Northern Valley Regional High School at Demarest. While attending Dartmouth, she played on the women's tennis and basketball teams. She coached the junior varsity women's basketball team, and assisted Chris Wielgus in coaching the varsity team during her senior year after undergoing surgery on both knees. She continued to coach at Dartmouth for a year after graduation while she was applying to law school. Friel was married to her first husband while attending University of Virginia School of Law, but the couple divorced six years later.

Friel resides in Brooklyn, New York with her three children. Her husband, James Friel died in 2002 in of bacterial meningitis. The couple were married in 1989.
