= CVTC =

CVTC may refer to:

- Crime Victims Treatment Center
- Chippewa Valley Technical College
