= Marty Goddard =

American crime victims' advocate (c. 1941–2015)

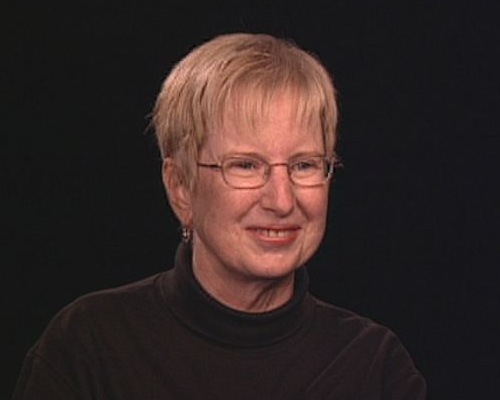
- Marty Goddard in a 2003 interview to Victim Oral History Project
- Born: 1941
- Died: 2015 (aged 73–74)

Martha "Marty" Goddard (c. 1941 – 2015) was an American crime victims' advocate who was instrumental in developing the rape test kit, used to methodically collect forensic evidence from victims of rape.

== Life ==
In the early 1970s, Goddard worked as a victims' advocate in Chicago, where an estimated 16,000 women were raped each year and police often would not believe victims. Only a tenth of this number were reported, and they rarely resulted in imprisonment of the attacker. She learned from the police that the evidence collected in hospitals from rape victims was often incomplete or poorly gathered. To improve the chances of offenders being identified and sentenced, she developed the concept and organization of a rape kit, a standardized way of collecting and preserving forensic evidence from victims of rape. She brought this idea to Louis R. Vitullo, who worked in the Chicago police crime lab. At first, he yelled at her and rejected her idea, according to Goddard's colleague Cynthia Gehrie, but then he proceeded to develop a kit similar to Goddard's design, taking personal credit for the invention.

In the mid-1970s, Goddard founded the Citizens Committee for Victim Assistance, which advocated and sought funding for the distribution of rape kits; much of the initial funding came from the Playboy Foundation.

Goddard continued to advocate for the rights of sexual assault victims through the 1980s, but developed a problem with alcohol and lived her later years in obscurity in Arizona. She died in 2015.

== Legacy ==
In the years after its development, the Vitullo Kit was introduced as a tool to collect evidence at over a hundred hospitals in Illinois by the Citizens Committee for Victim Assistance. One of these early Vitullo Kits was acquired by the Smithsonian Institution.

== See also ==
- Evidence
- Victimology
