= Sex Crimes Unit (film) =

2011 television film

Sex Crimes Unit is a 2011 documentary film by filmmaker Lisa F. Jackson featuring the work of the unit of the New York County District Attorney's office dedicated to the prosecution of rape and sexual assault. The film premiered on HBO on June 20, 2011.

== Synopsis ==
The film "examines the history of injustice toward rape survivors, trails the unit through its investigations, tracks the case of a prostitute who dared cry rape, and follows one survivor's 16-year journey to justice". Assistant D.A. Lisa Friel "serves as the audience's window" as the film follows members of the unit dealing with several rape cases, notably a 20-year-old case which became the first "John Doe" conviction in which archived DNA from a rape kit was matched to a perpetrator later arrested for another crime. Natasha Alexenko participated in the documentary.

== Critical reception ==
Sex Crimes Unit has been widely praised by critics, with John Anderson of Variety calling it "the real thing" and continuing that "Sex Crimes Unit has drama, suspense, terrific personalities and a great deal of heart". Positive notices for Sex Crimes Unit appeared in The Washington Post, Time, The New York Times, the Daily News, Variety, Bitch, Ms., and others.
