= Roy Pope Grocery =

Grocery and deli in Fort Worth, Texas

Roy Pope Grocery is a grocery and deli founded in Fort Worth, Texas in 1943.

== History ==
Roy Pope Grocery was founded in 1943 at 2300 Merrick St. by Roy and Rose Pope. It was known for selling gourmet items, including cheeses and charcuterie, and exotic game meat. In the 1960s, the grocery's butcher Ownyel Gentry began selling cooked hamburgers made from the grocery's meat scraps. It became known for its deli which served hamburgers, fried chicken, meat loaf, and King Ranch chicken. The grocery's founder, Roy Pope, also helped to found Kincaid's Hamburgers as Pope-Kincaid Grocery in the late 1940s.

After Pope died in 1968, the grocery was sold to John LeMond. Store manager Bob Larance bought the grocery from LeMond in 1976. Larance announced that the grocery would close in 2020 after five years of declining sales.

After the grocery closed, it was bought by a group of four local investors. The restaurant's interior was destroyed and it was completely remodeled over 13 months. It reopened in 2021, with a smaller grocery and larger restaurant area. The reopened grocery also featured a wine bar and coffee shop. It now serves items such as hamburgers, meat loaf, pollo al carbón, barbecue, sandwiches, and platters.
