= Natasha's Justice Project =

American rape kit funding non-profit

Natasha's Justice Project (NJP) is a 501(c)(3) non-profit organization that seeks to end the nation's current rape kit backlog crisis and empower and assist survivors of sexual assault through travel grants to testify at their trials. NJP was founded by Natasha S. Alexenko, a victim and survivor of sexual assault, in hopes of exposing and eliminating the current rape kit backlog that exists in public municipalities throughout the United States. NJP empowers survivors of sexual assault by getting their rape kits off the shelves and tested so that their perpetrator(s) are brought to justice.

== History ==
In 1993, Natasha S. Alexenko, a twenty-year-old college student living in New York City, was violently raped, sodomized, and robbed at gunpoint by an unknown assailant while walking back to her apartment. After returning to her apartment, Alexenko waited for an ambulance and traveled to a hospital, where hospital staff collected evidence for her rape kit. Following Alexenko's assault, all leads were exhausted by the New York City Police Department and her attacker was not identified. Alexenko's rape kit sat on a shelf at the New York City Police Department property clerk's office for nine years.

In 2003, Mayor Michael R. Bloomberg announced the "John Doe Indictment Project," a coordinated city-wide initiative that aimed to prevent sex offenders from using the statute of limitations to escape prosecution. It was estimated that an excess of 600 cases were soon to expire, including Alexenko's case. Nearly a decade after her attack, Alexenko received a call from the New York City District Attorney's Office as prosecutors looked to use the DNA from her rape kit to create a John Doe Indictment. In 2003, Alexenko testified before a grand jury and the DNA from her rape kit was indicted, allowing prosecutors to bring charges against her attacker whenever captured.

In 2007, the New York City Police Department found Alexenko's attacker through a match to his DNA profile in CODIS. Victor Rondon was arrested in Las Vegas Valley, Nevada on a minor charge. When extradited to New York for a parole violation, a detective performed a DNA cheek swab on Rondon, entering it into CODIS. Rondon's profile matched the DNA sample collected from Alexenko's rape kit. In 2008, Victor Rondon was tried before a jury and found guilty of eight counts of violent assault, including burglary in the first degree, robbery in the first degree, two counts of rape in the first degree, sodomy in the first degree, and sexual abuse in the first degree. Rondon was sentenced to 44 to 107 years in prison.

== Media Coverage ==
Natasha's Justice Project has been referenced in articles by the following media outlets:

- Associated Press This article was also picked up by Forbes, The Wall Street Journal and The Washington Times.
- CNN
- Newsday
- New York Post
- New York Times
- NPR
- TIME

Natasha's story was a part of season five episode six of I Survived... originally airing on November 11, 2012 on Bio.
