= Louis R. Vitullo =

American forensic scientist (1924–2006)

Louis Vitullo
- Louis Vitullo investigates a knife supposedly used by Richard Speck in the murder of eight nurses.
- Born: July 2, 1924
- Died: January 3, 2006 (aged 81); Barrington, Illinois, U.S.
- Occupations: police sergeant, microanalyst

Louis R. Vitullo (July 2, 1924 – January 3, 2006) was a Chicago police sergeant and chief microanalyst at the city's crime lab.

Vitullo helped to develop the rape kit, which standardized evidence collection in cases of sexual assault. Marty Goddard, a victim advocate, had seen the need for more systematic evidence at trial, and brought her concerns and the idea for a kit to Vitullo. Vitullo helped develop Goddard's prototype. Although the resulting evidence kits were for a time called Vitullo kits, this name has more recently come under criticism as part of a general push to honor Goddard's contribution to the kits.

== Death ==
Vitullo died at Advocate Good Shepherd Hospital in Barrington, Illinois, on January 3, 2006, after he collapsed at his home in Cary.
