= Kincade =

Kincade may refer to:

== People ==
- John Kincade, American sports talk show host
- Keylon Kincade (born 1982), American football player
- Tom Kincade (1887–1910), American race car driver

== Other ==
- Kincade (band)
- United States v. Kincade, lawsuit
- Kincade Fire

== See also ==
- Kincaid (disambiguation)
- Kinkade
