= D. B.'s Delight =

American children's quiz show

D.B.'s Delight was a locally produced St. Louis, Missouri children's television quiz show produced by CBS-owned affiliate KMOX-TV (later KMOV), Channel 4. The show ran 30 minutes on Saturdays and Sundays and aired in St. Louis from 1977 to 1988.

== Cast ==
D.B.'s Delight featured two regular co-hosts, including a live performer and a puppeteer. The original live performer was radio personality Young Bobby Day- who hosted the program from 1977 to 1984- and later, radio personality Guy Phillips hosted from 1984-1988. The puppet character was called "D.B. Doorbell" (performed, at various times throughout the years, by puppeteers Tom Brooks, Dale Thompson, Doug Kincaid, and Bobby Miller). In addition to prize giveaways (usually special show themed pens, pencils, and T-Shirts), the show also featured comedic sketches and appearances by St. Louis child performers Mickey Dougherty and Ryan Bollman.

== Production details ==
Jan Landis was the original producer of the show (she was later succeeded by Debi Pittman); the shows were alternately directed by Carl Petre and Skip Goodrum. Puppeteer Dale Thompson designed & built the first "D.B. Doorbell" puppet character; this was replaced in 1981 by a "Kincaid Karacter" puppet designed and built by St. Louis puppeteers William Kincaid and Doug Kincaid, when Doug Kincaid assumed the role of lead puppeteer that same year.

A winner of many regional Emmy Awards, D.B.'s Delight was followed up by KMOV in 1988 by its production of "Gator Tales", another St. Louis children's television show.
