= Gator Tales =

Gator Tales was a local children's television show produced in St. Louis, Missouri by local CBS affiliate KMOV. The show aired on Saturdays and Sundays throughout the Midwest from 1988 to 1999, including Missouri, Arkansas, and Illinois.

The 30-minute show- which stressed the development of good character values and self-esteem- featured a quirky puppet alligator named "Grouchie Gator" and his puppet friends (performed by puppeteer Doug Kincaid, a visiting storyteller friend, and an occasional walk-on guest star. The storylines revolved around "Grouchie's Place" (Grouchie Gator's backwoods store, located in an imaginary swamp) and usually involved Grouchie getting into some sort of trouble.

"Gator Tales" was produced by Al Frank (later Rebecca McDowell), and was directed by Skip Goodrum. Brothers William Kincaid and Doug Kincaid created the puppet characters featured on "Gator Tales", designed the set and created the props for the show. In addition, Doug Kincaid wrote the scripts for all the episodes.

From 1988 to 1993 the part of the storyteller was played by Bobby Norfolk, and from 1994 to 1999 the role was filled by Annette Harrison. The show at times featured guest appearances by notable local actors, including Todd Newton in one of his first professional TV roles.

"Gator Tales" won numerous regional Emmy Awards during its 11-year run on KMOV, and was one of the last of the "classic" local children's television shows to be produced, prior to the eventual dominance of syndicated broadcast programming, cable TV and the growth of such national children's television giants as Nickelodeon.

Doug Kincaid starred on "D. B.'s Delight", another children's show, prior to his work on "Gator Tales".
