= Kincaid Lake State Park =

State park in Kentucky, United States

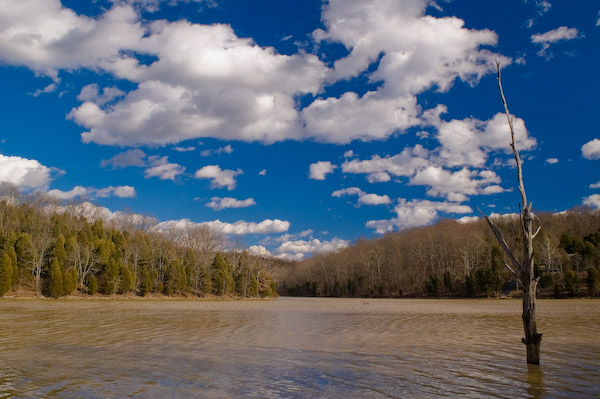
- Kincaid Lake

- Location within Kentucky Location within the United States
- Type: Kentucky state park
- Location: Pendleton County, Kentucky
- Coordinates: 38°43′12″N 84°16′50″W
- Area: 850 acres (340 ha)
- Created: 1963
- Operator: Kentucky Department of Parks
- Status: Open year-round

Kincaid Lake State Park is a park located near Falmouth, Kentucky in Pendleton County. The park encompasses 850 acres (340 ha) surrounding Kincaid Lake. In 1960 the park had changed its name to Falmouth Lake State Park, but the residents felt the name should go back to Kincaid for historical reasons. So in 1969 the name was finally changed back to Kincaid Lake State Park. In 1961 the dam to impound Kincaid Creek was constructed, and in 1963 the park was open to the public and whoever wanted to visit. From 1960 through 1967, progress became Kincaid, and they added a beach, bathhouse, boat docks, picnic areas, camp sites, and hiking trails. The park has 850 acres, with a gift shop and 84 campsites. There is a nine-hole golf course as well as a pool.

Recreational activities include boating, fishing, miniature golf, hiking, and swimming.
