= Kinkead's =

American restaurant

Kinkead's, An American Brasserie
- Interactive map of Kinkead's, An American Brasserie

Restaurant information
- Established: 1993
- Closed: December 22, 2012
- Owner: Bob Kinkead
- Food type: Seafood; New American cuisine
- Rating: James Beard Award (1995), Best American Chef – Mid-Atlantic
- Location: 2000 Pennsylvania Avenue NW, Washington, D.C., United States
- Coordinates: 38°54′2″N 77°2′42.3″W

Kinkead's, An American Brasserie was a fine dining restaurant in Washington, D.C. open from 1993 to 2012, named for its chef and owner Bob Kinkead, primarily featuring seafood and New American cuisine.

== History ==
Kinkead's was located at 2000 Pennsylvania Avenue NW, and it quickly became one of the most popular restaurants in DC when it opened in October 1993. It was named one of the "25 best new restaurants in America" by Esquire Magazine. In 1996, the Mobil Guide awarded four stars to Kinkead's, one of only two restaurants in Washington to earn that distinction.

In 1995, Bob Kinkead won the James Beard Award for "best American chef" in the Mid-Atlantic Region. Many politicians and celebrities ate at Kinkead's, including President Bill Clinton, Senator Ted Kennedy, and dancer Mikhail Baryshnikov; and many of Washington's best chefs trained there, including Logan Cox, Jeff Black, and Ris Lacoste.

== Publications ==
In 2005, Bob Kinkead published a cookbook, Kinkead's Cookbook: Recipes From Washington D.C.’s Premier Seafood Restaurant.

== In popular culture ==
In James Patterson's novels, Kinkead's restaurant is a frequent dining and date spot for the character Alex Cross.

== Closure ==
Kinkead's closed on December 22, 2012.

== See also ==
- List of New American restaurants
