= Natasha Alexenko =

American-Canadian crime victim advocate (1973–2024)

- Born: Natasha Simone Alexenko; February 28, 1973; West Islip, New York, U.S.
- Died: October 31, 2024 (aged 51); West Islip, New York, U.S.
- Education: New York Institute of Technology
- Years active: 2011–2024
- Known for: Natasha's Justice Project

Natasha Simone Alexenko (February 28, 1973 – October 31, 2024) was an American-Canadian crime victim advocate and nonprofit founder who worked to address the backlog of untested rape kits in the United States. She was the founder of Natasha's Justice Project and contributed to legislative reforms related to forensic evidence processing. Alexenko was previously the director of the Long Island Maritime Museum.

== Early life and education ==
Natasha Simone Alexenko was born on February 28, 1973, in West Islip, New York, and raised in St. Catharines, Ontario. Her mother, Nevart Mnatzaganian-Alexenko, was a dietitian. Her father, Victor Alexenko, worked as a drug counselor but had a substance abuse problem and died of an overdose when she was nine years old. She had a sister.

Alexenko attended the New York Institute of Technology, where she studied filmmaking. While living in Manhattan as a student, she was sexually assaulted on August 6, 1993. The experience of undergoing a forensic medical examination after the assault had a profound impact on her, as she later recounted that the process of evidence collection was invasive and traumatic.

== Career and advocacy ==
After her assault, Alexenko’s rape kit remained untested for nearly a decade. In 2003, she was informed by the New York County District Attorney's office that her kit was part of a backlog of approximately 17,000 untested rape kits in New York City. Her kit was tested shortly before the statute of limitations for her case was due to expire, leading to an indictment against her attacker based on his DNA.

Victor Rondon, her assailant, was identified through his DNA in 2007 after being arrested for parole violations in Nevada. His DNA matched evidence from Alexenko’s rape kit. Rondon was extradited to New York, where he was tried and convicted in 2008 on charges including rape, sodomy, burglary, and sexual abuse. He was sentenced to 44 to 107 years in prison.

Hearing about other survivors’ experiences motivated Alexenko to leave her position as the director of the Long Island Maritime Museum, to pursue advocacy full-time. In 2011, she founded Natasha's Justice Project, a nonprofit organization dedicated to advocating for the timely testing of rape kits and supporting survivors of sexual assault.

Her advocacy efforts included frequent testimony before state legislatures and the U.S. Congress. She contributed to legislative efforts in states like California, Nevada, and Virginia to pass laws mandating the testing of rape kits within specific timeframes. In Virginia, she collaborated with legislators, including state senator Richard Black, to pass a 2016 law addressing the backlog of untested rape kits.

Alexenko’s work was also featured in media outlets. She participated in the HBO documentary Sex Crimes Unit in 2011, which highlighted the New York District Attorney’s office, and she co-hosted events such as a 2015 press conference with vice president Joe Biden and New York district attorney Cyrus Vance Jr. announcing federal grants to help reduce the rape kit backlog. She authored a memoir in 2018, A Survivor’s Journey: From Victim to Advocate, in which she detailed her experiences and advocacy work.

== Personal life and death ==
Alexenko was married to Scott Sessa and lived in West Islip, New York, in her later years. She died due to complications from amyotrophic lateral sclerosis (ALS) and multiple sclerosis (MS) in West Islip, on October 31, 2024, at the age of 51.
