= Serial rapist =

Rapist who rapes many people regularly

A serial rapist is an individual who commits “three or more separate events of attempted or executed sexual coercion (with or without penetration) that occur over a period greater than 72 hr”. The terms sexual predator, repeat rape, predatory crime, and multiple offending are also commonly used to describe the activities of those who commit several consecutive rapes.

Serial rapists are categorized on their own, differing from single-victim rapists due to increased weapon use and criminal sophistication. Serial rapists often display specific behavior patterns that differentiate them from other sexual offenders, such as selecting stranger victims and using an ambush or blitz approach on their victims. Specific behavioral and strategic patterns can be used by law enforcement when offender profiling to aid in arrests and conviction. Serial rapists present specific tactics and personality traits that can aid law enforcement with investigation, prediction, and prevention of serial rape cases.

== Law enforcement ==
Often, the evidence that is collected from the physical examinations and testimony of those who were raped is in the possession of numerous law enforcement agencies and may impede the recognition that the rapist has committed the crime over a period of time. Conviction of the rapist can be delayed when victims do not cooperate in the investigation. Evidence can consist of DNA, saliva and fingerprints, hair, vaginal swabs, fingernail scrapings, and bed linens. Those investigating serial rapes often identify the rapist with a "nickname" before an arrest is made by characterizing the tactics or patterns of the rapes.

Serial rapists are more likely to be convicted than a rapist who is known by the victim. Unlike those convicted for a single case of rape, serial rapists often go unrecognized due to the slow process of analyzing the backlog of rape kits. It may take many years for a past rape to be identified as being committed by one person.

Case Western Reserve University has identified the tendency of sexual offenders of being previously arrested. 26% had previously been arrested for sexual assault. 60% were arrested for at least one other sexual assault unrelated to the first one. In order to curb and catch such offenders, the FBI created its Behavioral Science Unit in 1974.

== Tactics ==
Serial rapists use multiple tactics to lure victims. One tactic a serial rapist can use is online dating sites to identify potential victims. Another tactic used by serial rapists is threatening to harm the victim and their family. Drugging the victim is sometimes employed. Some serial rapists are specific in identifying their targets and their schedules. A serial rapist may describe their activities on websites, describing the tactics they use to commit the sexual assault. In 2014, an 18-year-old individual accused of serial rapes had used cell phone messaging apps Facebook, Kik, and Snapchat to establish a relationship with girls. Some serial rapists drive victims to remote locations.

== Personality traits ==
Perpetrators can be described as "highly manipulative, very charismatic and charming." Serial rapists differ from single-victim rapists. The distance traveled before the rape occurs was found to be further with the single-victim rapists. Single-victim rapists use a "capture" method, sometimes using the tactic of being a hitch hiker, or a "con" method by meeting at a bar or party and engaging in social interaction. Conversely, serial rapists have a tendency to ambush or use a "blitz" approach of a victim. A serial rapist is more likely to target a stranger than a single-victim rapist.

A serial rapist is more prone to exhibit "criminally sophisticated behaviors" such as using a condom and gloves. Serial rapists are more likely to control physical resistance by gagging, binding, blindfolding, and smothering. They are more likely to question the victim. Awareness of investigative, forensic methodology characterizes a serial rapist rather than a single-victim rapist and may be used by law enforcement as an investigative aid.

Serial rapists are more likely to target sex workers than are single-victim rapists. They have also been described as being able to improve their ability and expertise to commit their assault through the "study" of serial rape. This includes rehearsal by viewing films, pornography, and reading relevant literature, using sexual fantasies, growth in knowledge in assault-related skills, learning from the examples of other serial rapists, and their own past experiences of physical or sexual abuse.

== Prevention ==
Rachel Lovell, Case Western Reserve University describes her research: "Our findings suggest it is very likely that a sexual offender has either previously sexually assaulted or will offend again in the future...Investigating each sexual assault as possibly perpetrated by a serial offender has the potential to reduce the number of sexual assaults if investigations focus more on the offender than on single incidents."

Investigation of the offender instead of the crime has been proposed to prevent serial rapes. The backlog of analyzing rape kits impedes the identification of serial rapists. Hundreds of thousands of rape kits remain untested across the US. Most law enforcement agencies do not track or count them. The process is complicated, invasive, time-consuming and may re-traumatize victims.

The FBI maintains a DNA database and comparisons between cases can be made. Unfortunately, the backlog of analyzing rape kits can allow the perpetrator to continue their crime before being identified with other assaults. Though no victim of a serial rapist can be blamed for the crime, reducing the risk of becoming raped by a serial rapist is possible, according to law enforcement organizations.

== See also ==
- List of serial rapists
- Serial killer
