= Kinkaid (surname) =

Kinkaid is a surname. Notable people with the surname include:

- Keith Kinkaid (born 1989), American ice hockey goaltender
- Mary Holland Kinkaid (1861–1948), American novelist and journalist
- Moses Kinkaid (1856–1922), American politician
- Thomas C. Kinkaid (1888–1972), American admiral

== See also ==
- Kincaid (surname)
- Kinkade
