= Rape investigation =

Procedure to gather facts about a suspected rape

Rape investigation is the procedure to gather facts about a suspected rape, including forensic identification of a perpetrator, type of rape and other details.

The vast majority of rapes are committed by persons known to the victim: only between five and 15 percent of assaults are perpetrated by a stranger. Therefore, the identity of the perpetrator is frequently reported. Biological evidence such as semen, blood, vaginal secretions, saliva, vaginal epithelial cells may be identified and genetically typed by a crime lab. The information derived from the analysis can often help determine whether sexual contact occurred, provide information regarding the circumstances of the incident, and be compared to reference samples collected from patients and suspects. Medical personnel in many countries collect evidence for potential rape cases by using rape kits. The time it takes to have rape kits processed has been criticized.

== Forensic evidence ==
=== Preservation of evidence ===
The preservation of evidence is key to investigation and future prosecution of the perpetrator. While empathizing with and maintaining respect for the victim, make every attempt to:

- Do not cut through any clothing or throw away anything from the scene.
- Place bloodstained (or soiled) clothing into a separate paper (not plastic) bag.
- Respectfully and empathetically attempt to discourage the victim from cleaning themselves (all evidence will matter) including:
  - Urinating
  - Changing clothes
  - Bowel movements
  - Rinsing out the mouth
- Encourage the victim to seek medical attention.

=== Victim injuries ===
A forensic medical examination is conducted head to toe to record all injuries from minor to severe for the purpose of recovering evidence to support the victim's assertion that a rape took place without consent. Swabbing for bodily fluid samples (saliva, semen, blood) reveals evidence that may identify or eliminate a suspect as well as the nature of the sexual activity that took place.

=== Toxicology report ===
Establishing the victim's levels of alcohol, prescription, recreational, or unknown drugs by taking urine and blood samples can support an assertion of lack of capacity to consent to sexual activity.

=== Passage of time ===
Whether an alleged victim of rape comes forward days, weeks, months or even years after an alleged assault took place it is not always appropriate to conduct a physical forensic examination. Such a passing of time degrades any useful physical forensic evidence. Situations in which allegations of rape or childhood sexual abuse are the subject of an investigation relying on memory as the only evidence, a form of forensic interviewing may be used to assist with the investigation.

== Documentary evidence ==
Documentary evidence will also be collected during a thorough rape investigation. This type of evidence can include paper records and digital records categorized as either public, judicial or private documents such as:

- police records
- court documents
- business records
- personal papers (letters, diary, journal)
- time logs
- phone records
- medical records
- social service records
- psychiatric records
- tape recordings
- video tapes
- CCTV or surveillance video footage
- computer records
- microfiche
- emails, texts, social media posts, instant messaging records

== Perpetrator identification ==
=== DNA profiling ===
DNA profiling is used by crime laboratories for testing biological evidence, most commonly by means of the polymerase chain reaction (PCR), which allows analysis of samples of limited quality and quantity by making millions of copies. An advanced form of PCR testing called short tandem repeats (STR) generates a DNA profile that can be compared to DNA from a suspect or a crime scene. Blood, buccal (inner cheek) swabbings or saliva should also be collected from victims to distinguish their DNA from that of suspects.

Criminals may plant fake DNA samples at crime scenes. In one case Dr. John Schneeberger, who raped one of his sedated patients and left semen on her underwear, surgically inserted a Penrose drain into his arm and filled it with foreign blood and anticoagulants. Police drew what they believed to be Schneeberger's blood and compared DNA on three occasions without a match.

== Police statements ==
Rape investigations are typically initiated by the alleged victim themselves but suspected rape or sexual abuse can also be reported by a third party, investigating police officer or mandated reporter. The alleged victim will give either a written or video-recorded account to police of what they alleged happened. Then the accused perpetrator will subsequently be interviewed by the same investigating police. The recorded police statements will be used as evidence in court if charges are laid and a prosecution results from the investigation.

== Contested quality of rape investigations ==
=== Criticism by sexual violence victim advocates ===
Sexual violence victim advocates have long claimed that police do not take rape victims seriously when they report their alleged assault to police. The crux of the claim is that police all too often rely on outdated and tired rape myths about women putting themselves in situations where they are likely to get raped, or that they lie about being raped to exact revenge. Advocates have for decades campaigned to governments and supreme courts to change laws and set legal precedents in order to facilitate a higher rate of rape charges and criminal convictions. These campaigns have resulted in legal changes across the common-wealth legal systems including broadening the criminal code definition of rape and sexual assault to include acts such as unwanted hugging, kissing or touching, removing the requirement to provide verifiable corroboration that a crime occurred, and changing the statute of limitations to allow more allegations of historical rape or sexual assault to be prosecuted. The campaigning has also led the U.K.'s justice department to issue guidance primarily aimed at police officers in planning and conducting interviews with alleged adult and child sexual violence victims.

=== Criticism by wrongful conviction advocates ===
Advocates on behalf of those wrongfully convicted of crimes they did not commit, including rape, have long claimed that some police and prosecutors lack professional integrity, fail to conduct thorough investigations and engage in misconduct in order to achieve a conviction, regardless of whether or not the accused may be innocent. There are many documented cases in the U.S. and Canada where this has been proven to be the case for the wrongfully convicted who either maintained their innocence or were coerced into pleading guilty to a crime they did not commit or that did not occur. Most recently in 2018, UK defence lawyers claimed that faith in the fairness of trials was eroded by police and prosecutors playing games in pursuit of convictions by withholding digital evidence that exonerated accused persons, such as mobile phone evidence.

== Circumstances and type of rape ==
Abrasions, bruises and lacerations on the victim help elucidate how a rape was carried out. 8 to 45 percent of victims show evidence of external trauma, most commonly at the mouth, throat, wrists, arms, breasts and thighs: trauma to these sites comprise approximately two thirds of injuries, while trauma to the vagina and perineum account for approximately 20 percent.

Recent coitus can be determined by performing a vaginal wet-mount microscopy examination (or oral/anal if indicated) for detection of motile sperm, which are seen on the slide if less than three hours have elapsed since ejaculation. However, only one-third of sexual assaults result in ejaculation into a body orifice. Further, the assailant may have had a vasectomy or have experienced sexual dysfunction (roughly 50 percent of assailants suffer from impotence or ejaculatory dysfunction). In addition, acid phosphatase levels in high concentrations is a good indicator of recent coitus. Acid phosphatase is found in prostatic secretions and activity decreases with time and is usually absent after 24 hours. Prostate-specific antigen (PSA) may be detected within a 48-hour period. The seminal fluid of vasectomized men also contains a significant PSA level. Nonmotile sperm may be detected even beyond 72 hours after intercourse depending on staining techniques.

== See also ==
- Effects and aftermath of rape
- Post-assault treatment of sexual assault victims
- Rape
- Rape kit
- Sexual assault
