= Bobby Norfolk =

American storyteller and arts educator

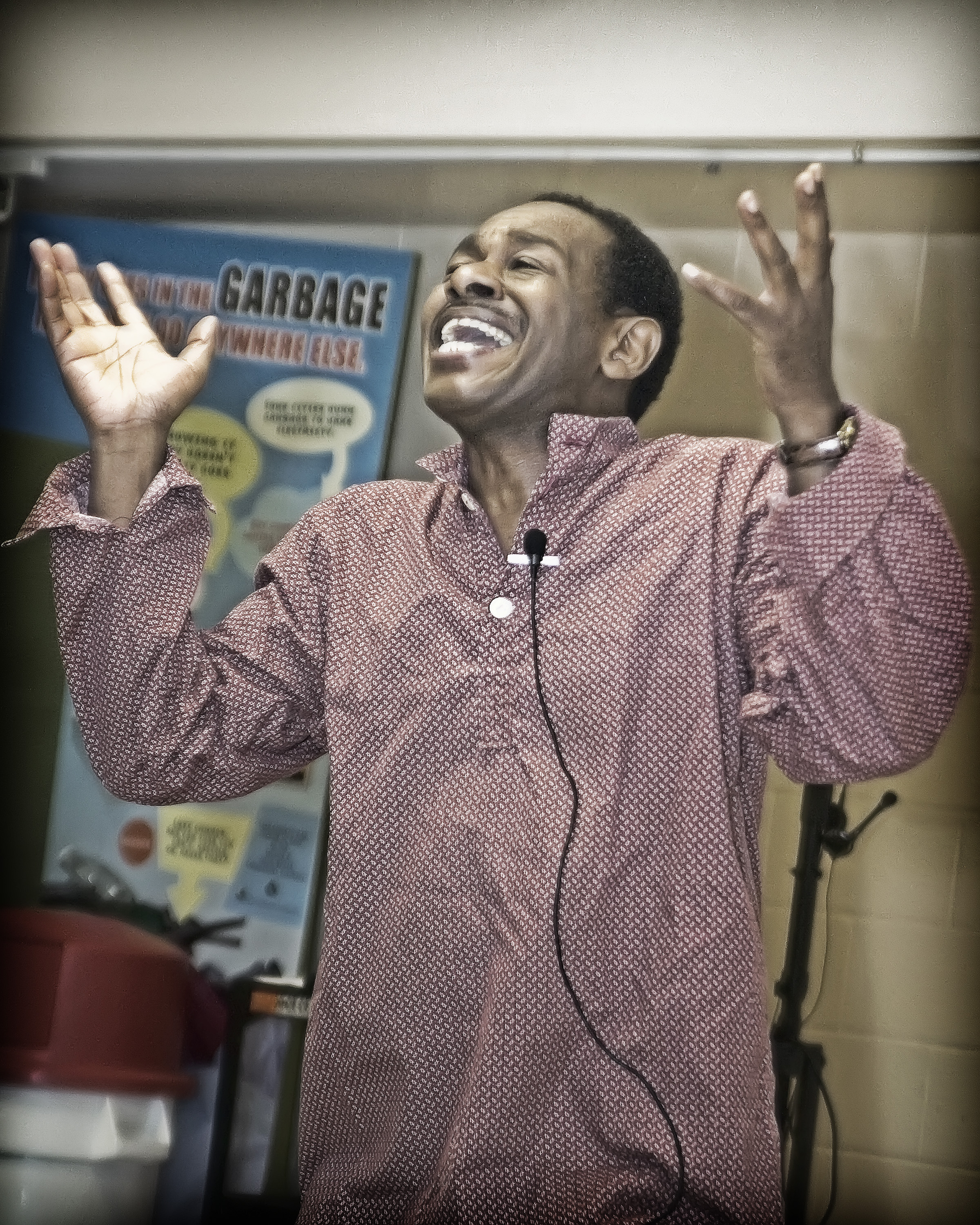
Norfolk in 2010

Bobby Norfolk is an American storyteller and arts educator.

== Information ==
He has received three Emmy Awards as host for the television series Gator Tales and is also the host of the Emmy Award nominated cable series Children's Theater at Bobby's House. Norfolk performs internationally for both children and adults and is also a regular performer at the National Storytelling Festival.

== Background ==
Bobby Norfolk began his career as a stand-up comedian. He started out locally at the Funny Bone Comedy Club. He was also an actor that worked with The St. Louis Black Rep and Imaginary Theater Company in St. Louis. Bobby Norfolk also worked as a National Park Service Ranger at the Gateway Arch. To start off his story-telling career, Norfolk made his first appearance in the year of 1979 at the St. Louis Storytelling Festival. This is where he discovered that he could combine his skills of acting and comedic work to become a talented storyteller. With this career, he received many honors and awards. In October 2009, Bobby Norfolk received the national Circle of Excellence Oracle Award that is presented by the National Storytelling Network. This award is given to the most prestigious storytellers. Within the time of his career, Norfolk has also created over ten CD's of storytelling. Some of these CD's have won the Parents Choice Gold Award. He has also co-authored eight children's books. Norfolk is known to travel not only nationally, but internationally as well giving performances, keynotes, and workshops for audiences. Now that he has been a past member of the board of directors for the National Storytelling Network, he now has the job of serving on the St. Louis Storytelling Festival Advisory Council. Bobby Norfolk also is a featured artist with Springboard to Learning and the Missouri Arts Council. He now currently owns a storytelling company that began in the year of 1989 that is known as Folktale Productions. He claims that his inspiration for telling stories began when his son was three years old. He would buy him books to read to him before he put his son down for bed at night. The more he read to his son, the more he realized that he would add his skill of theatricals into it. Since then on, he embarked on his journey of storytelling.

== See also ==
- Storytelling
- Storytelling festival
