= United States v. Kincade =

US Court of Appeals Case

- Court: United States Court of Appeals for the Ninth Circuit
- Full case name: United States v. Kincade
- Argued: March 23, 2004
- Decided: August 18, 2004
- Citation: 379 F.3d 813

Court membership
- Judges sitting: Mary M. Schroeder, Harry Pregerson, Stephen Reinhardt, Alex Kozinski, Diarmuid O'Scannlain, Michael Daly Hawkins, Barry G. Silverman, Kim McLane Wardlaw, Ronald M. Gould, Richard R. Clifton, Consuelo María Callahan (en banc)

Case opinions
- Majority: O'Scannlain, joined by Schroeder, Silverman, Clifton, Callahan
- Concurrence: Gould
- Dissent: Reinhardt, joined by Pregerson, Kozinski, Wardlaw
- Dissent: Kozinski
- Dissent: Hawkins

Laws applied
- U.S. Const. amend. IV; DNA Analysis Backlog Elimination Act of 2000

United States v. Kincade, 379 F.3d 813 (9th Cir. 2004) (en banc), is a case of the United States Court of Appeals for the Ninth Circuit dealing with the constitutionality of collecting and retaining DNA from parolees.

== Background ==
=== Statute ===
The federal statute in question was the DNA Analysis Backlog Elimination Act of 2000 ("DNA Act") requiring that those convicted of certain types of federal crimes give their DNA to federal officials, which is then given to FBI. This DNA is stored the FBI's Combined DNA Index System ("CODIS"), which other law enforcement officers could compares other unsolved past crimes. Additionally, the database can be used to link those convicted to new unsolved crimes.

=== Particulars ===
Because of an armed robbery conviction, Thomas Cameron Kincade was sentenced to 97 months imprisonment. Subsequently, Kincade was paroled on a supervised release. Kincade's parole officer requested that Kincade provide a blood sample pursuant to DNA Act. Not based on any religious reasons, Kincade refused to comply and take a blood test. Subsequently, Kincade's conditional release was revoked. Kincade brought a suit challenging the constitutionality of DNA Act as a violation of his Fourth Amendment rights against unreasonable search and seizure/

=== Procedural history ===
The District Court held that Kincade's failure to provide blood sample was a violation of the Kincade's release. A three-judge panel of the Ninth Circuit, in a 2 to 1 decision, reversed the District Court's decision that required Kincade to give his blood, since it violated his Fourth Amendment right to unreasonable searches and seizures. Sitting en banc, the Ninth Circuit reheard the decision. In a 5–4 decision the Ninth Circuit reversed the initial three-judge decision, and upheld the District Court's decision.

== Analysis ==
=== Issue ===
Can the government collect and store a parolee's DNA, subjecting a parolee to a blood test, without violating that person Fourth Amendment right against unreasonable searches and seizures?

=== Holding ===
The government can collect and store a parolee's DNA, subjecting a parolee to a blood test, without violating that person Fourth Amendment right against unreasonable searches and seizures.

=== Reasoning ===
First, because Fourth Amendment is involved, the "reasonableness in all the circumstances of the particular governmental invasion of a citizen's personal security." Reasonableness is inexorably tied to whether government complied with the Warrant Clause, which is predicated on probable cause. However, there are instance where "Special Needs" supplants the Warrant Clause to have reasonable suspicion.

Despite having an interest in bodily integrity, blood test now happen frequently, and are not as an invasive they once were; thus, the bodily integrity is not determinative.

The court concludes special needs doctrine should not be applied in this case. Rather, the totality-of-the-circumstance test is more applicable. This is because average law-abiding citizens' expectation of privacy is greater than those who have conditional releases; the latter is more restricted.

The plurality rejects the dissent's argument that this sets into motion an Orwellian 1984 scenario where everyone could potentially be required to submit to a DNA test. To hold contrary is to ignore the difference between convicts and the average citizen. Also, the plurality argue that the court will stand as a guard against future expansion. Lastly, the DNA Act as implemented and structured, is minimally invasive.

=== Dissents ===
Two different dissenting opinions were written by the panel.

Reinhart, Pregerson, Kozinski, and Wardlaw, JJ.

There is an inherit danger to allowing personal data to be centrally stored. Governments, may be corrupt and abuse their power– e.g. J. Edgar Hoover's dossiers.

This decision runs contrary to America's tradition of bodily integrity. Additionally, no matter how altruistic, the government has more information on you that they would without the database, hence, the dynamic shifts.

Lastly, the "totality of the circumstances test" does not apply in this case because it has never been used in case where the search was without suspicion.

Kozinski, J.

Once Kincade completes his supervised release, Kincade's constitutional rights and protections rest, and he is an ordinary citizen like anyone else. The issue is really, should be government allowed to exploit what it obtained at one period for the rest of Kincade's life? The plurality is really saying you're statistically like to commit a future crime and we should have that information. Accordingly, anyone – pilots, students, athletes, drunk drivers, etc. – who are already required to provide that information become subject to that pluralities test. Lastly, the problem with saying, "not while this court sits," is that futures courts may use this decision as precedent, and will then cross the Rubicon.

== Other jurisdictions ==
Although the Supreme Court has not ruled on the issue, the other federal circuits held DNA databases do not violate the Fourth Amendment.
