= Kinkade =

Kinkade is a surname. Notable people with the surname include:

- Amelia Kinkade (born 1963), American actress and animal communicator
- Bill Kinkade (born 1957), American politician
- Dale Kinkade (1933–2004), linguist
- David Kinkade (born 1983), American former musician
- Jude Kinkade, fictional character from the VH1 series Hit the Floor
- Kat Kinkade (1930–2008), American activist
- Lynda Kinkade, Australian journalist
- Mike Kinkade (born 1973), American baseball player and coach
- Reynolds R. Kinkade (1854–1935), American jurist
- Thomas Kinkade (1958–2012), American painter

== See also ==
- Kincade (disambiguation)
- Kincaid (disambiguation)
- Kinkaid (disambiguation)
