= Kincaid Lake =

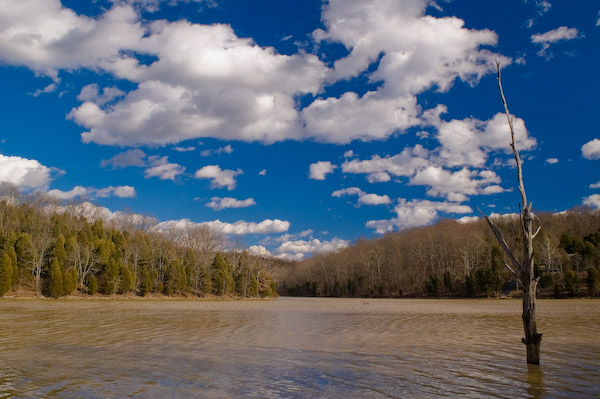

- Location within Kentucky
- Location: Pendleton County, Kentucky
- Coordinates: 38°43.4′N 84°16.548′W
- Type: reservoir
- Basin countries: United States
- Surface area: 183 acres (74 ha)
- Surface elevation: 604 ft (184 m)

Kincaid Lake is a 183-acre (0.74 km^{2}) artificial lake in Pendleton County, Kentucky. It was created in 1961 by impounding Kincaid Creek, a branch of the Licking River. It is the primary attraction of Kincaid Lake State Park.

== See also ==
- Kincaid Lake State Park
