= Katharine T. Kinkead =

American journalist and author

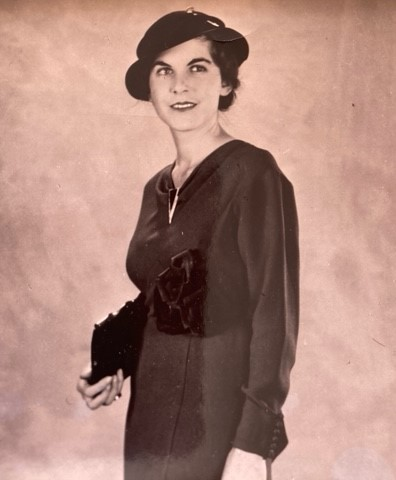
- Born: May 18, 1910; Galion, Ohio, US
- Died: November 18, 2001 (age 91); Salisbury, Connecticut, US
- Education: University of Wisconsin-Madison (M.A. 1932)
- Years active: 1934–1967
- Spouse: Eugene Kinkead
- Children: 4

Katharine T. Kinkead (May 18, 1910 - November 18, 2001) was one of the first women reporters on The New Yorker. She contributed to the magazine for 25 years, and pioneered coverage of controversial social issues such as illegitimacy, domestic violence, and racial injustice through the mid-1960s. The feminist author of several books is also known for How An Ivy League College Decides on Admissions, a 1961 book based on her "famous" New Yorker report about Yale University's process to select an all-male freshman class.

== Biography ==
Kinkead was born in 1910 to a German-American civil engineer and a WASP teacher. She grew up in Missouri and Ohio in a large extended family of accomplished women, some college professors, and men business managers. At 24, after graduating from the University of Wisconsin with an M.A. in comparative literature and a degree from the Sorbonne in Paris, she left her job as a receptionist in an Ohio false tooth factory and moved to New York City for a $20 a week editorial job with a book publisher. She later married New Yorker writer Eugene Kinkead.

== Writing career ==
Harold Ross, New Yorker founding editor, hired Kinkead in 1942 as a staff reporter. Ross was "...very choosy about his reporters. For every one he hired, he passed on ten others because he could not countenance sloppy reporting or lazy imaginations. He especially had no use for reporters who talked a good game but fell down at the typewriter," Ross biographer Thomas Kunkel noted. Suspicious of women reporters, Ross hired very few and those he did were rarities in 1930s and 1940s male-dominated American journalism.

Kinkead dove in quickly with a report on the Red Cross Overseas Hospital workers treating U.S. World War Two casualties. She wrote many unsigned "Talk of the Town" pieces after most New Yorker men reporters, including her husband, went to war.

In the late 1940s, encouraged by fact editor William Shawn, who succeeded Harold Ross as editor-in-chief in 1952, she introduced readers to a seldom seen side of Manhattan: its innovative Home Term Court assigning men charged with criminal assault on their wives to psychological and marriage counseling, often with treatment for alcoholism or other addictions, instead of jail; its social agencies helping single mothers stigmatized as "fallen women" find shelter and work and keep their babies if they wished, instead of being forced to give them up; its shelters for teen runaways; and its adoption agencies for abandoned and illegitimate children.

Kinkead's focus, as in her civil rights reporting, was on people helping people fight injustice and abuse. In 1960, she joined a Durham, N.C. picket line with black and white student leaders of the non-violent sit-in movement that had desegregated Woolworth lunch counters in Durham, and would go on to desegregate others throughout the South, and some movie theaters in other states. Her report on the sit-in movement, an early, major civil rights victory, is anthologized in The New Yorker's collection of classic reportage from the 1960s.

A shy perfectionist and intellectual, Kinkead was The New Yorker's children's book editor in the 1950s and maintained her career while raising four children in Manhattan and Chappaqua, New York. She and husband Eugene were one of several married couples writing for The New Yorker, and their "family was extremely important to the magazine and to its readers," today's New Yorker editor-in-chief David Remnick said. Kinkead's last years were sent researching an unpublished biography of Marguerite D'Angouleme, Queen of Navarre, the Renaissance author and diplomat, who was the sister of French King Francis 1st.

== Bibliography ==
=== Books ===
- How an Ivy League College Decides on Admissions. W. W. Norton & Company. 1961
- Walk Together, Talk Together: The American Field Service Student Exchange Program. W. W. Norton & Company, 1962

=== Articles (partial selection) ===
- A Cat in Every Home, The Big New Yorker Book of Cats. Random House. 2013
- It Doesn't Seem Quick to Me (Desegregating Durham), The 60s: The Story of A Decade. Modern Library. 2017
- Something to Take Back Home, The New Yorker. January 1, 1964
- A Rose is a Rose is a Rose is a Business, The New Yorker. July 11, 1958
- Just Give Us Peace in Our Home, (troubled families), The New Yorker, December 3, 1954
- The Runaways, The New Yorker. February 15, 1952
- They Love Mamie in Augusta, McCall’s Magazine. September, 1953
- The Lonely Time, (unwed mothers), The New Yorker. January 20, 1951
- Miss Latimer and her Kit B., The New Yorker, November 11, 1944
- Comment, The New Yorker, February 3, 1939
