= Robert Kinkead =

American chef and restaurateur (1952–2019)

- Born: June 1, 1952; Providence, Rhode Island
- Died: December 15, 2019 (aged 67); Murrells Inlet, South Carolina
- Education: University of Massachusetts Amherst
- Culinary career
- Previous restaurant(s): 21 Federal, Kinkead's
- Award(s) won: 1995 James Beard Foundation Award, Best Chef: Mid-Atlantic

Robert Kinkead (June 1, 1952 – December 15, 2019), known as Bob, was an American chef and restaurateur based in Washington D.C. He was best known for his eponymous seafood restaurant Kinkead's, which operated from 1993 to 2012 and earned Kinkead the 1995 James Beard Award for best American chef in the Mid-Atlantic Region.

== Early life ==
Kinkead was born in Providence, Rhode Island, and grew up in Massachusetts, where he was one of ten siblings; his brother David also grew up to be a chef.

Bob Kinkead studied psychology at the University of Massachusetts Amherst, though he came short of graduating until 2004 when the university conferred the degree by counting his new cookbook as a final paper.

== Career ==
Kinkead pursued a culinary career and worked in several restaurants in New England before becoming head chef and part-owner of 21 Federal in Nantucket. In 1987, he opened a sister restaurant, also named 21 Federal, in downtown Washington, D.C. This restaurant closed in early 1993 after filing for bankruptcy. In October 1993, he opened his eponymous restaurant in D.C’s Foggy Bottom neighborhood: Kinkead's, an American Brasserie. The restaurant was well-reviewed and was named to Esquire Magazine's list of the 25 best new restaurants in America. In 1995, Kinkead won the James Beard Award for best American chef in the Mid-Atlantic Region. In 2005, Kinkead published a cookbook, Kinkead's Cookbook: Recipes From Washington D.C.’s Premier Seafood Restaurant. Kinkead was known for mentoring many notable chefs in Washington, D.C., including Logan Cox, Jeff Black, Tracy O'Grady, Brendan L'Etoile, and Ris Lacoste. Kinkead's eponymous restaurant closed in December 2012. Kinkead also owned Hell Point Seafood in Annapolis, Maryland and Colvin Run Tavern in Vienna, Virginia, both of which were closed before Kinkead's. In 2004, Kinkead opened Sibling Rivalry in Boston with his brother, David; the restaurant closed in 2013. In 2013, Kinkead opened a pop-up restaurant, Ancora, in the Watergate complex. Ancora closed in 2014, and Kinkead opened a more casual restaurant, Campono, next door.

In 2016, Kinkead received the Duke Zeibert Capital Achievement Award from the Restaurant Association of Metropolitan Washington.

== Personal life ==
Kinkead retired with his wife, Dianne, to Murrells Inlet, South Carolina, where he died on December 15, 2019, of heart disease and diabetes.
