= Kincaid's Hamburgers =

Restaurant information
- Established: 1946
- Food type: Hamburgers
- Location: 4901 Camp Bowie Boulevard, Fort Worth, Texas
- Website: kincaidshamburgers.com

Kincaid's Hamburgers is a chain of hamburger restaurants in Texas. The first Kincaid's opened in Fort Worth, Texas in 1946 as a grocery store.

== Description ==
The restaurant was a grocery store from its opening until the 1960s, and retains the concrete flooring and neon signs from that period. Customers are seated at countertops cut from the original store shelves with picnic tables added later. It is known for serving hamburgers with half-pound beef patties on Mrs. Baird's buns, hot dogs, sandwiches, and milkshakes.

== History ==
The establishment first opened in 1946 as the Pope-Kincaid Grocery Store by Charles Kincaid and Roy Pope of Roy Pope Grocery. It was eventually renamed the Charles Kincaid Grocery & Store. It was a full service grocery store and meat market. In 1964, the store's head butcher Ownyel Robert "O. R." Gentry began preparing and cooking hamburgers for customers, as a way to use up unsold ground beef. He installed a $25 grill for the purpose. The hamburgers became increasingly popular with customers, and in 1967 Gentry bought the store from Charles Kincaid. Gentry sawed off the tops of store shelves in order to make countertops for customers to eat from. Despite the success of its hamburger business, the grocery store saw fewer shoppers in the 1970s as supermarkets began to replace local grocery stores.

In 1991, Gentry's son Robert and daughter-in-law Lynn took over the grocery and converted it into a restaurant. They stopped offering groceries and removed all of the produce bins and food sections so that they could place picnic tables inside.

The restaurant has received praise from critics for its simple menu and methods of preparation. It was ranked one of the best hamburger restaurants in America and Texas by publications such as Texas Monthly and Fort Worth Star-Telegram. A 1970s article by Life that ranked it alongside Cassell's Hamburgers as one of the two best in the country. It has since opened other locations in Texas.
