= Rape kit =

Package to gather physical evidence of a rape

A rape kit or rape test kit is a package of items used by medical, police or other personnel for gathering and preserving physical evidence following an instance or allegation of sexual assault. The evidence collected from the victim can aid the criminal rape investigation and the prosecution of a suspected assailant. DNA evidence can have tremendous utility for sexual assault investigations and prosecution by identifying offenders, revealing serial offenders through DNA matches across cases, and exonerating those who have been wrongly accused.

The kit was developed in Chicago in the mid-1970s, in order to provide a more uniform protocol for evidence collection after sexual assaults. While Louis R. Vitullo is frequently credited as the developer of the first kit, it was originally researched and proposed to Vitullo by Martha 'Marty' Goddard, who was a victim advocate and founder of Chicago's Citizens for Victims Assistance organization, and herself a sexual assault survivor. For years, the standardized tool was referred to as a Vitullo kit. Today it is colloquially referred to as a rape test kit or a rape kit, which are used interchangeably to refer to the specific evidence that is obtained through the use of the rape kit. Other terms and abbreviations used are sexual assault kit (SAK), a sexual assault forensic evidence kit (SAFE), sexual assault evidence collection kit (SAECK), sexual offense evidence collection kit (SOEC) and physical evidence recovery kit (PERK).

== History ==
In the 1970s, after the women's movement had gained its first traction, and the media began to cover the reporting of rape and other forms of sexual assault, a sexual assault survivor named Martha Goddard embarked upon a crusade to create a comprehensive rape evidence collection kit and lobby for its adoption by law enforcement agencies. The lack of standardized protocol for correctly collecting such evidence, and the lack of understanding of or sympathy for those suffering the psychological trauma of such crimes meant that such evidence, when it was collected, was not preserved in a way that maintained its integrity. Goddard founded the Chicago-based Citizens Committee for Victim Assistance to address the issue, researching the process by consulting with medical professionals, law enforcement officials, members of the justice system, and scholars. Through her friendship with businesswoman Christie Hefner, Goddard acquired funding for the kits from Playboy Foundation, the charity founded by Hefner's father, Playboy founder Hugh Hefner.

The kit was first utilized in September 1978, according to a 1980 Chicago Tribune article, when 26 Cook County hospital emergency rooms incorporated its use into their standard practice for gathering trace evidence when treating rape victims. It consisted of a cardboard box containing items including swabs, slides and a small comb, and instructions for using them. Less than two years later, 215 hospitals across Illinois were using it.

The kit became known as "Vitullo kit" after Chicago police sergeant Louis Vitullo, the Chicago crime lab's chief microanalyst who worked on high-profile cases. This designation came about at Vitullo's insistence because, according to Vitullo's colleague, Marian Caporusso, forensic experts had "the final say-so for a lot of the design features." As a result, the press described the effort to create and implement the kits as a collaboration between Vitullo and Goddard.

Based upon the effective use of the kits in Chicago, New York City adopted Goddard's kit system in 1982. In 1984, Goddard gave a presentation about the Chicago pilot project at an FBI conference. Based on her presentation, the Department of Justice provided Goddard with funding to travel to help other states begin their own rape kit pilot programs.

In a 2003 interview, Goddard related that through her work in a Chicago teen crisis center, she learned about the very low rate at which rapes resulted in prosecutions.

== Description and use ==
Medical professionals learn how to use a rape kit at Camp Phoenix near Kabul, Afghanistan.

=== Kit contents ===
A rape kit consists of small boxes, microscope slides and plastic bags for collecting and storing evidence such as clothing fibers, hairs, saliva, blood, semen or body fluid.

Rape kits vary by location, but commonly include the following items:

- Instructions
- Documentation forms
- Bags and sheets for evidence collection
- Blood collection devices
- Clear glass slides
- Comb used to collect hair and fiber from the victim's body
- Labels
- Nail pick for scraping debris from beneath the nails
- Sterile sample containers
- Self-sealing envelopes for preserving the victim's clothes, head hair, pubic hair, and blood samples
- Sterile water and saline
- Sterile urine collection containers
- Swabs for collecting fluids from the lips, penile opening, cheeks, thighs, vagina, anus, and buttocks
- White sheets to catch physical evidence stripped from the body

=== Examiners ===
Rape kit examinations are performed by medical professionals, most commonly physicians and nurses. In some locations, examiners have received special training on performing sexual assault forensic exams. For example, many hospitals and health facilities in the United States and Canada have Sexual Assault Nurse Examiners (SANEs) who are trained to collect and preserve forensic evidence and to offer emotional support to the victim. According to the International Association of Forensic Nurses, the number of SANE programs has steadily increased throughout the world since its introduction in the United States in the 1970s. As of 2016, over 700 SANE programs exist in the United States, Canada, and Australia. SANEs were introduced in the United Kingdom in 2001. Japan has had a limited number of SANEs since as early as 2007.

=== Evidence collection ===
The process of collecting a rape kit is highly invasive and extremely time-consuming. Prior to the exam, it is desired that patients avoid using the restroom, combing their hair, bathing, changing their clothes, or cleaning up the scene of the assault. Most evidence needs to be collected within 72 hours to be viable, and patients are advised to either bring or wear the clothing they had on when attacked to the exam. Damaged evidence is something that is common among rape kits because survivors of sexual assault typically desire to wash themselves as soon as possible following an attack.

The physical examination begins with the victim disrobing while standing on a large sheet of butcher paper, which collects any trace evidence that may fall from the victim's body or clothes. The victim's clothing is carefully examined for trace evidence before each garment is individually packaged with sheets of paper between folds to protect against cross-contamination.

Examiners then collect biological samples of semen, blood, saliva and other bodily fluids by swabbing the victim's genitals, rectum, mouth, and body surfaces. Examiners also collect fingernail scrapings and pluck head and pubic hairs. If the facility has the means, and the victim consents, the examiner will also take photographs of genital injuries using a colposcope.

In addition to facilitating the collection of biological samples and injuries, the kit guides the documentation of the victim's medical history, emotional state, and account of the assault. The entire process of collecting the rape kit takes between 2.5 and 5 hours to complete. While the exam is going on, the victim has the right at any point to ask questions or stop the examination completely.

=== Testing ===
Upon completion, the rape kit is sealed and typically transferred to local law enforcement. In the United States, if the victim is undecided about reporting the rape, the kit may instead be stored at the exam facility or a law enforcement facility as an "anonymous" kit.

The law enforcement agency conducting the rape investigation can send the rape kit, in whole or in part, to the forensic science crime lab for analysis. Forensic scientists will try to develop a DNA profile of the assailant using the samples collected in the rape kit. If successful, the crime lab will search the DNA profile against the DNA profiles of convicted offenders and other crime scenes using a DNA database. For example, crime labs in the United States run DNA profiles through the three-tiered Combined DNA Index System (CODIS), which was developed in 1990 and contains DNA profiles at the national, state, and local levels. Similarly, the need to solve sexual assault crimes in Brazil led the Forensic DNA Research Institute of Federal District Civil Police to create a DNA database in 1998 containing evidence specifically collected in sexual assault cases. DNA matches in such databases not only aid in identifying the assailant where unknown to the victim, but also may help determine whether the assailant (known or unknown to the victim) is a serial rapist. These findings eventually may be made available for use in court.

In some cases, the rape kit does not yield DNA evidence and the forensic scientist is unable to develop a DNA profile of the assailant. This may be because the assailant did not leave DNA behind, or too much time passed before the victim had a rape kit exam performed, or the rape kit evidence may have been improperly collected, stored, or handled. Due to the backlog of sexual assault cases, forensic scientists have been challenged with the task of determining how to process the sexual assault kits effectively and within the statute of limitation on assaults.

== Influence on sexual assault cases ==
Rape kit evidence can aid the criminal rape investigation and the prosecution of a suspected assailant. It may also be used to exonerate the wrongly accused. The benefit of rape kit evidence depends in part on the character of the assault.

=== Stranger cases ===
In stranger sexual assault cases, the assailant is unknown to the victim. In such cases, rape kits may be instrumental in identifying the assailant through DNA profiling, which research suggests may help lead to an arrest. For example, a 2009 study examining sexual assault cases from two of 389 crime laboratories in the United States found that stranger-rape cases with forensic evidence were 24 times more likely to produce an arrest than stranger-rape cases without forensic evidence.

Stranger cases can take a longer time to identify the perpetrator because without forensic evidence, the case becomes significantly more difficult to prosecute. This is one of the main problems that many victims face when coming forward that they had been raped.

=== Acquaintance rape ===
The vast majority of sexual assaults are non-stranger (or "acquaintance") cases where the victim knows the assailant. While identifying a suspect is not at issue, the kit's forensic evidence can be used to confirm offender identity in acquaintance rape cases. The kits may also be used to determine whether the offender committed other crimes.

In many acquaintance sexual assault cases, the accused assailant will defend the accusations as consensual encounters. In such cases, rape kit evidence that documents the victim's injuries, such as photographs of bruising, is a useful tool to corroborate allegations of non-consensual sexual contact. In cases where the victim suffers a serious injury, filing charges and reaching convictions is more likely.

In other acquaintance cases, the assailant may deny that sexual intercourse occurred at all. In such cases, specimens that show either sperm or specific enzymes that are unique to seminal fluid (enzymes prostatic acid phosphates or acid phosphatase) can be used to prove sexual contact.

=== Serial rape cases ===
Serial rape is defined as an assailant that has raped two or more victims. Serial rape may involve sexual partner violence or non-partner sexual violence, and it may be in the same family, in the same or different regions of a city, or in different cities or states. DNA collected by rape kits can help lead to identifying and arresting a person guilty of serial rape.

In both stranger and non-stranger sexual assault cases, DNA testing of rape kit evidence and DNA database hits help identify serial sexual assaults. For example, a 2016 study of 900 previously untested rape kits in Detroit, Michigan found 259 CODIS hits, which included stranger and non-stranger sexual assault DNA profiles. Sixty-nine of the hits were serial sexual assault hits, 15 of which were acquaintance (non-stranger) sexual assault cases.

In a study analyzing the status of Brazil's DNA database in 2015, researchers found 223 matches related to 78 serial rapists. At the time, the DNA database contained 650 profiles from one type of analysis of samples collected in rape kits—male autosomal STR profiles—and 420 profiles from a second type of analysis—complete 23Y-STR profiles.

== Barriers to use ==
=== Backlog ===
Rape kit backlog refers to the problem of untested sexual assault kits. The problem is twofold: it involves both the issue of rape kits not being submitted to crime labs for testing and the related issue of crime labs not having enough resources to test all of the submitted kits.

One cause of the backlog of rape kits being tested is detectives and/or prosecutors failing to request a DNA analysis. When someone fails to request a DNA analysis, the kit sits in a police evidence storage facility untested. A rape kit is considered backlogged when it is not submitted for analysis within 10 days of the evidence being submitted. A second cause of the backlog is crime laboratory facilities receiving the rape kits and not testing them in a timely manner. The Joyful Heart Foundation, an anti-sexual violence charity founded by actress and activist Mariska Hargitay, considers these kits backlogged when the kit is not analyzed within 30 days of it being sent to the lab.

Conservative estimates indicate there are 200,000–400,000 untested rape kits in U.S. police departments, and large stockpiles of kits have been documented in over five dozen jurisdictions, sometimes totaling more than 10,000 untested rape kits in a single city. The federal DNA Initiative has helped state as well as local governments to increase the ability of their DNA laboratories and decrease backlogs. The actual number of untested rape kits is undefined as of 2015 because there is no nationwide system set up to keep track of the cases. This can be attributed to the lack of a common definition of backlog, which can relate to cases not worked within a month of submission, or cases that have not been submitted to the forensic labs for analysis.

=== Destruction ===
In some locations, rape kits are destroyed before ever being tested and sometimes without notifying the victim. For victims of sexual assault in the United States, for example, the length of time for which a kit can go untested may be shorter than the statute of limitations. Policies in some jurisdictions, such as Massachusetts, instruct that rape kits be destroyed as early as six months after they are initially stored. A 2016 HuffPost report stated that it was not uncommon for labs to dispose of untested kits, sometimes illegally, in Colorado, Kentucky, and North Carolina. As of 2016, no U.S. state provides a right to retain a rape kit until the expiration of the statute of limitations, and only six states and Washington, D.C. provide a right for the prompt testing of a kit. By contrast, the shortest statute of limitations in the US is three years, though many states do not have a statute of limitations for rape. Some states, including Washington and Idaho, have legislation in place that requires a tracking system allowing law enforcement, medical facilities, and survivors to check the status of kits throughout the entire process, from collection to analysis and final disposition, and for survivors to be notified if a decision is made not to test a kit or to destroy it.

=== Inaccessibility ===
Victims' access to rape kits is often limited. In many locations, the non-availability of rape kits prevents victims from obtaining medico-legal evidence that would otherwise aid in the criminal investigation and prosecution of their assailant. In Nigeria, for example, a study analyzing sexual assault in Ile-Ife found that the majority of victims went to the hospital within 24 hours of a sexual assault, but did not receive a forensic medical examination because rape kits have yet to be introduced in the country.

In locations where rape kits are available, a lack of trained examiners may still impede the ability of victims to undergo timely sexual assault examinations. Shortages force victims to wait hours for an exam or to travel long distances in order to have a rape kit performed within the recommended 72 hour timeframe. These effects have been seen in Canada and rural areas in the United States, where the shortage of examiners has recently been identified.

Insufficiently trained examiners may also lead to deficiencies in rape kits. A study of rape kit collection in South Africa found that rape kits were sometimes inappropriately used, missing proper specimens, or missing necessary forms. The study recommended improved training of health care workers to overcome these deficiencies.

=== Cost ===
The cost of rape kits is a barrier to use in many locations where the victim is billed for the collection of forensic evidence. Collecting a rape kit reportedly costs upwards of $1,000. In some countries, reimbursement for the cost is contingent on the victim reporting the crime to police. In Japan, for example, a sexual assault victim must pay for the rape kit upfront, but police will reimburse medical fees if the victim reports the assault.

Victims of sexual assault in the United States faced similar hurdles until the 2005 reauthorization of Violence Against Women Act (VAWA), which requires states to pay for the cost of the rape kit regardless of the victim's decision to report the assault to the police. Under the more recent 2013 VAWA reauthorization, which took effect in March 2015, victims also cannot be required to pay the upfront cost of the exam. States may still require victims to submit claims for the rape kit exams to their personal insurance providers, as long as they are not billed for a deductible or a copay. In the United States, several organizations have pledged millions of dollars in grants to help fund the analysis of rape kits in forensic laboratories.

== By country ==
=== Republic of Ireland ===
In the Republic of Ireland, victims of rape and sexual assault receive a forensic exam in a Sexual Assault Treatment Unit (SATU). Evidence is sent to Forensics Science Ireland (FSI), based in the Phoenix Park. At the end of 2018, there was a backlog of 70 cases, and it was taking up to a year for results to be released.

=== Mexico ===
In Mexico, sexual assault victims make up almost half of all women. Rape is legally defined by a use of force rather than a lack of consent. Reporting and documenting physical displays of violence is therefore essential for the persecution of the abuser. The persecution office of the report will ask for a gynecological and psychological evaluation. Medical examinations must be made within 72 hours of the assault. Under the Mexican law, sexual assault victims have the right to bring one other person with them to file this report. However, it is estimated that the majority of sexual assaults go unreported. Specialised prosecution offices exist in Mexico for crimes of violence against women (fiscalías especializadas) and Centres for Women's Justice (Centros de Justicia para las Mujeres).

=== United States ===
In the United States, rape kit costs, availability, proper implementation of the invasive exam, and backlogs have historically presented problems for victims of rape seeking justice.

As of May 2009 the federal Violence Against Women Act of 2005 went into effect, requiring state governments who wish to continue receiving federal funding to pay for "Jane Doe rape kits" or "anonymous rape tests". These tests allow victims too traumatized to go to the police to undergo the procedure at hospitals. The hospitals maintain the collected evidence in a sealed envelope identified only by a number, unless police access its contents upon the victim's decision to press charges. While the practice had been recommended by the Federal Bureau of Investigation since at least 1999, and was already followed at some health clinics, colleges and hospitals, and in the state of Massachusetts, many jurisdictions up until then refused to pay the estimated $800 cost of the rape examination without a police report filed by the victim.

In 2011, the National Institute of Justice published a report, The Road Ahead: Unanalyzed Evidence in Sexual Assault Cases, providing an overview of deep problems nationwide and the contributing factors to ongoing bureaucratic difficulties. These backlogs and delays may lead to a lack of justice for victims, the report notes, and "in worst-case scenarios...lead to additional victimization by serial offenders or the incarceration of people wrongly convicted of a crime". Findings include:

1. As an indicator of how widespread this problem has become, "18 percent of unsolved alleged sexual assaults that occurred from 2002 to 2007 contained forensic evidence that was still in police custody (not submitted to a crime lab for analysis)"
2. One major challenge is that 43% of law enforcement agencies "do not have a computerized system for tracking forensic evidence, either in their inventory or after it is sent to the crime lab"
3. On average, 50–60% of kits test positive for biological material that does not belong to the victim
4. Survey responses indicated that there may be some misunderstanding of the value of biological evidence. Forty-four percent of the law enforcement agencies said that one of the reasons they did not send evidence to the lab was that a suspect had not been identified. Fifteen percent said that they did not submit evidence because "analysis had not been requested by a prosecutor".

The federal government established the Combined DNA Index System (CODIS) to share DNA matches among federal, state and local jurisdictions. The federal DNA Analysis Backlog Elimination Act of 2000 and Debbie Smith Act authorizations in 2004 and 2008 provide additional funding to state and local jurisdictions to help clear their rape kit testing backlogs. As of 2014, the federal government estimates a nationwide backlog of 400,000 rape kits, including many from the 1990s when evidence was collected but not tested for DNA due to high costs and more primitive techniques available at the time.

==== California ====
According to a 2009 report by Human Rights Watch, Los Angeles, California has the largest known rape kit backlog in the United States, with at least 12,669 languishing in storage facilities of the Los Angeles Police Department, Los Angeles County Sheriff's Department, and 47 independent police departments in Los Angeles County, and "smaller, but not inconsiderable" backlogs residing at police crime labs. These backlogs consist of both kits stored in evidence storage facilities, for which DNA analysis is not requested by investigating detectives, and those submitted for testing at crime lab facilities, but which have not been tested in a timely manner. Although authorities have struggled to address the backlog problem, their attempts have reportedly been hampered by funding issues and politics. As a consequence of these backlogs, assault survivors are often not informed of the status of their rape kit or their case.

==== Illinois ====
Across Illinois, where law enforcement and prosecutors handle sex crimes differently, a police backlog of nearly 8,000 rape kits accumulated between 1995 and 2009, only 20% of which were tested. Effective September 1, 2010, The Illinois Senate's Sexual Assault Submissions Act (Senate Bill 3269) requires law enforcement agencies to submit all evidence collected by rape kits for laboratory analysis within 180 days after the effective date of October 15, 2010, with a written notice to the State Police. Illinois was the first state to adopt such a law, setting a precedent for other states to follow. As of January 1, 2011, the Illinois House of Representatives Bill 5976 addresses victims' confidentiality rights and the timely processing of rape kit evidence. Both bills passed the Illinois General Assembly unanimously, and were signed by Governor Pat Quinn.

==== New York ====
In New York State, a rape kit is also known as Sexual Offense Evidence Collection (SOEC) kit. As of 1999, New York City in particular held nearly 17,000 untested rape kits, which were eventually eliminated with outside labs. In 2007, the city opened a $290 million forensic biology lab. In 2015, the New York County District Attorney's Office announced that they would be awarding $38 million in grants to jurisdictions across the country in order to test backlogged rape kits.

==== Texas ====
In Texas, it is considered unnecessary to administer a rape kit after 72 hours following the attack, as it is considered unlikely for useful evidence to be collected, though other types of evidence may still be documented during the medical examination, such as survivor statements, and visible injuries such as bruises, lacerations or bite marks, through visual inspection, photographs and transcription.

==== Washington, D.C. ====
In Washington, D.C., prior to the Violence Against Women Act, which went into effect in 2009, rape kits, despite being standard issue in hospitals, have historically been difficult to obtain, according to an April 2009 report by the Washington City Paper. According to the report, rape survivors historically waited up to 12 hours in D.C. emergency rooms while the OB-GYNs present would attend to more immediate emergencies, such as births, after which the invasive exam would be performed by inexperienced residents, who made poor witnesses at trial. The Sexual Assault Nurse Examiner (SANE) program was established in 2000 at Howard University Hospital in order to address this concerns, after a decade of attempts by Denise Snyder, executive director of the D.C. Rape Crisis Center (DCRCC), to find a major hospital willing to host the program, most of whom either cited economic concerns or declined to respond to her inquiries. After Howard University adopted the program, survivors encountered the problem of requiring police authorization before receiving a rape examination, which Snyder attributes to a desire to maintain low crime rates on the part of law enforcement agencies, whom, according to the Washington Paper, tend to be unsympathetic to alleged rape victims. Detective Vincent Spriggs, of D.C. Metro P.D.'s Sexual Assault Unit, cites instances of false or unconvincing rape accusations, and requests for rape kits by women who wish to have pregnancy tests or the morning-after pill administered, as an obstacle to more open use of the kits. In 2008, Howard University canceled the SANE program, after which it reopened under the supervision of the mayor's office.

== Depictions in media ==
The problem of rape kit backlogs was employed as a significant plot point in "Behave", the September 29, 2010 episode of the television crime drama Law & Order: Special Victims Unit, which depicts the operations of a police sex crimes unit. In the episode, detectives investigate the case of a woman who has been raped multiple times by the same man over the course of fifteen years (played by Jennifer Love Hewitt). Their investigation leads them to discover that the perpetrator has raped women all over the United States. The detectives attempt to contact the Special Victims Units in other cities, only to discover that most of them have never tested the majority of their collected rape kits. The episode was based on the real-life story of advocate and survivor Helena Lazaro.

== See also ==
- Combined DNA Index System (CODIS)
- DNA database
- Forensic identification
- Post-assault treatment of sexual assault victims
- Rape in the United States
- Sexual assault
- Sexual Assault Survivors' Rights Act
