= Ris Lacoste =

American chef

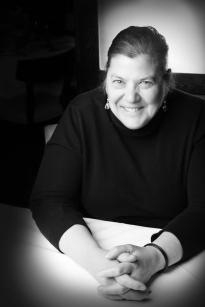
- Chef Ris Lacoste
- Born: New Bedford, Massachusetts
- Education: University of Rochester in New York University of California at Berkeley Anne Willan's La Varenne Écôle de Cuisine

Doris (Ris) Lacoste is an American chef, restaurateur, philanthropist, and community leader based in Washington D.C. She has been a chef in DC for over three decades and is the owner of RIS, an American bistro in Washington, D.C.

== Early life ==
Born in New Bedford, Massachusetts, Lacoste grew up the fifth of seven children in a French Canadian family. Lacoste began working at the age of 12 at her mother's neighborhood grocery store, Gorka's Market, a Polish grocery, where she learned about Polish food. At 16, she began a four-year stint as a waitress Friendly's, a New England chain restaurant.

== Education ==
At 18, Lacoste graduated as valedictorian from St. Anthony Catholic High School in New Bedford, a block up the street from where she lived. Lacoste enrolled at the University of Rochester with the intention of becoming a doctor. She eventually transferred to the University of California at Berkeley with the hopes of becoming a United Nations translator, putting her French, Spanish and Latin studies to good use. She graduated from Berkeley with a degree in French literature. In 1981, she moved to Paris to improve her French and was offered a job at La Varenne Ecole de Cuisine as a receptionist and editorial stagiaire in exchange for the school's prestigious Grand Diplome in French cuisine. She was taught by chefs like Anne Willan, the English cookbook author and owner of La Varenne. Lacoste was later a frequent contributor to Fine Cooking magazine.

== Culinary career ==
=== Kinkead's ===
Lacoste moved back to the United States in the fall of 1982 and began working for chef Robert Kinkead. She returned to France the following year to join the Buddy Bombard Great French Balloon Adventure team in Burgundy. After this, she returned to New England and joined Kinkead at Harvest Restaurant in Cambridge, Massachusetts, at Harvard Square. In the summer of 1985, the Harvest team opened a new restaurant, 21 Federal, in Nantucket. In late 1987, a second 21 Federal was opened in Washington, D.C., although the restaurants closed in 1993. Lacoste continued worked with Kinkead as he opened Kinkead's American Brassiere, which would remain a D.C. institution for the next two decades.

=== 1789 Restaurant ===
In 1995, Lacoste left Kinkead's to become the executive chef for Clyde's Restaurant Group's 1789 Restaurant in Georgetown. During her time as executive chef, she was named the 1999 Chef of the Year by the Restaurant Association of Metropolitan Washington, and 1789 was named Restaurant of the Year at The Capital Restaurant & Hospitality Awards. Lacoste also earned awards from The Washington Post and Wine Spectator for her regional American cooking, and was nominated for the Best Chef Award by the James Beard Foundation. As chairman of the local chapter of the American Institute of Wine & Food, she hosted Julia Child's 90th birthday in 2002, which was held simultaneously with the opening of a replica of Child's kitchen at the Smithsonian Museum of American History. The dinner Lacoste cooked for the occasion was the subject of a 2004 documentary, Cooking for Julia, by D.C.'s public broadcasting network, WETA-TV.

=== RIS ===
In 2005, Lacoste left 1789 after ten years, and opened RIS in December 2009. RIS serves lunch, dinner, private dining, and carryout and features a seasonal American menu along with a roster of wines, local and international beers, and craft cocktails. Many of Lacoste's dishes have become city-known staples including her "Scallop Margarita," French onion soup, "My Mother's Meatloaf," New England mussels, Portuguese steak, and butterscotch pudding. As a tribute to her late mentor and friend, Lacoste includes at least one of Chef Kinkead's favorite dishes on her menu at all times.

== Consulting and community ==
Lacoste has consulted a number of fine dining establishments and restaurateurs in her career, including Jeffrey Buben's Vidalia Eye, the Abi Najm family's Street Cafe, and Mazza Gallerie, owned by Judy Hammerschmidt and Tom Williams.

Beyond the kitchen, Lacoste frequents Farmers' markets and is an advocate and board member of farmers markets in the D.C. and Northern Virginia areas. She believes these markets are a source of inspiration for her cuisine as well as a meeting point for investment in the local community and dedication to sustainable farming.

== Awards and accolades ==
- Outstanding Restaurant of the United States, James Beard Foundation, Semifinalist, 2023
- Duke Zeibert Lifetime Achievement Award, RAMW 2023
- Ris Lacoste Day, June 5, Official Proclamation, Office of Mayor Muriel Bowser, 2023
- Tom Sietsema's 6 Favorite Places to Eat, 2023
- Most Powerful Women of 2015, Washingtonian Magazine
- Meals From The Masters, Celeb Chefs Brunch, 2014
- Restaurant of the Year, RAMW, 2000
- Best Chef, James Beard Foundation Nominee, 1999
- Chef of the Year, RAMW, 1999
- Award of Excellence, Wine Spectator, 1995
- D.C. Michelin Guide's Recommended Restaurant
- Torch Award For Community Spirit, Foggy Bottom West End Village Board
- WACA Legend Award

== Television and documentary ==
Good Day Cafe, FOX 5 Washington, 2014
The District Dish, Washington, DC, 2009
Cooking For Julia, PBS 2004
