= Doug Kincaid =

American artist, writer, and performer (born 1962)

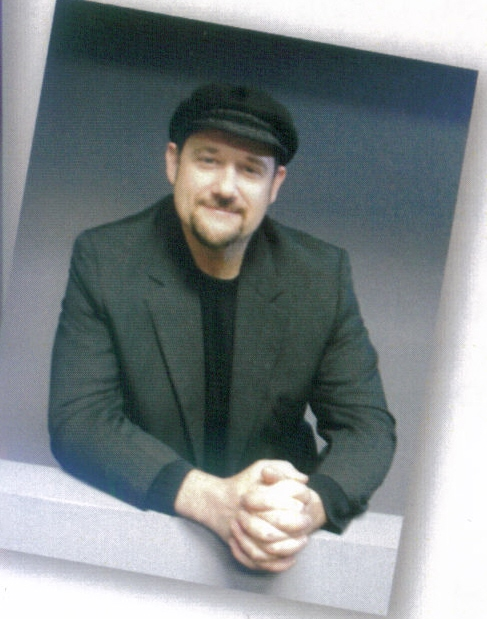
Doug Kincaid in St. Louis, 2012

Douglas Doerr Kincaid (born 1962) is an American artist, writer, and performer, best known for his work in the fields of puppetry and promotional costuming (mascot costumes).

== Early influences, education, and career ==
From an early age, Kincaid was interested in the creation, depiction, and performance of imaginary characters and settings, especially in the fields of motion pictures, television, and theme parks. He lists as major artistic influences Walt Disney, puppeteers & producers Sid and Marty Krofft, animation legend Chuck Jones, writer and Twilight Zone creator Rod Serling, pioneering character make-up artists Lon Chaney and Dick Smith, veteran character actor Felix Silla, and British comedians Monty Python and Benny Hill.

In 1977, at the age of 15, he co-founded- with brother William Kincaid- The Kincaid Karacter Company, which would become one of the best known national producers of professional mascot costumes, helping to develop and manufacture such iconic American mascots as "BUD MAN" and "Spuds Mackenzie" for Anheuser-Busch (AB-InBev), "Fredbird" for the St. Louis Cardinals, the "Billiken" for Saint Louis University, "Elroy Elk", the national mascot of the Benevolent and Protective Order of Elks (Elks Lodges), and "Homer", the handyman mascot of home improvement giant The Home Depot.

From 1978 to 1981, Kincaid and his brother Bill worked with the Six Flags Theme Park in St. Louis, Missouri, creating and portraying costumed characters, performing in the puppet theater, and designing characters and sets for the Six Flags haunted attractions, as well as creating costumes & props for Six Flags television commercials. While attending Washington University in St. Louis in 1980, Kincaid began a 19-year relationship with CBS affiliate KMOX (later KMOV-TV), performing, writing, and creating sets, puppets, and characters (again with brother Bill) for two children's programs, D. B.'s Delight (1977–1988) and Gator Tales (1988–1999). In 1989, Bill left The Kincaid Karacter Company to pursue other interests, but has continued to contribute to the company throughout the years as a creative consultant.

During the summer of 1993, Kincaid was a featured performer/puppeteer on Ranger Bob's Buckaroo Club, a children's television show produced by WKCF TV 18 in Orlando.

== Recent projects ==
In addition to year-round touring and performing as a professional puppeteer, Kincaid continues to design and create mascot characters, puppets, sets, props, displays, and touring shows for a wide variety of organizations and applications, including corporations, professional sports teams, and theme parks. Recently, he is active in the development of The Kincaid Karacter Studios, a multifaceted production services company located in Atlanta, GA.
