= Kincaid =

Kincaid may refer to:

== People ==
- Kincaid (surname)

== Places ==
=== Canada ===
- Kincaid, Saskatchewan, a village

=== United States ===
- Kincaid, Illinois, a city
- Kincaid, Kansas, a city
- Kincaid, West Virginia, a census-designated place
- Kincaid Lake, Pendleton County, Kentucky
- Kincaid Park, a municipal park in Anchorage, Alaska
- Kincaid Mounds State Historic Site, a prehistoric archaeological site in Illinois

== Other uses ==
- Clan Kincaid, a US-based organization dedicated to the Kincaid family's Scottish roots
- The Kincaid School, Piney Point Village, Texas
- Kincaid Chance, from the novel The Brothers K, by David James Duncan
- John G. Kincaid & Company, a former British marine engine manufacturer
- Kincaid's Hamburgers, restaurant in Fort Worth

== See also ==
- Kincaid v. Gibson
- Thomas Kinkade (1958–2012), painter of realistic, bucolic, and idyllic subjects
- Kincade (disambiguation)
