= Eugene Kinkead (writer) =

Journalist, New Yorker editor and writer

- Born: September 18, 1906; New York, N.Y.
- Died: August 8, 1992 (aged 85); Tarrytown, New York
- Education: University of Wisconsin-Madison
- Spouse: Katharine Theobald
- Children: 4
- Father: Eugene F. Kinkead

Eugene Kinkead was an American journalist and staff writer and editor at The New Yorker for 58 years. A World War Two war correspondent described as New Yorker founding editor Harold Ross's "favorite gumshoe", Kinkead was an editor of the magazine's "The Talk of the Town" department for many years, and the author of seven books about nature and history, fiction, poetry, profiles, and light verse.

== Biography ==
Born in New York City, Eugene "Gene" Kinkead was the eldest son of New Jersey Democratic Congressman Eugene F. Kinkead and actress and civil servant Edith Warner. After his parents’ divorce, Kinkead grew up in Washington, D.C. He graduated from the University of Wisconsin, where he lettered in swimming, and was an editor of the literary magazine. Harold Ross, New Yorker magazine co-founder and its first editor, hired Kinkead in 1932 as a staff writer. He shared an office with William Shawn, who became a lifelong friend.

Initially, Kinkead wrote Talk of the Town and sports columns. Ross also assigned Kinkead to report facts, including determining how many tens of thousands of dollars Ross's office secretary had stolen from him before committing suicide. James Thurber recalled, "His (Ross's) favorite reporter for such work was Eugene Kinkead, whom he admiringly called 'the best gumshoe in the business'". During World War II, Kinkead was a Navy war correspondent aboard the USS Indianapolis, flagship of the U.S. Fifth Fleet, and witnessed the American victory in the 1944 Battle of the Philippine Sea that destroyed the Imperial Japanese Navy's ability to continue carrier warfare in the Pacific. His poem, Prayer after the Twilight Attack by our Carrier Planes on the Japanese Fleet, describes victorious American pilots ditching into the sea on their return runs, low on fuel, after the battle.

Kinkead wrote over eight hundred New Yorker "Comment" and "Talk of the Town," including one about U.S. Airforce pilot Paul W. Tibbets who dropped the atomic bomb on Hiroshima in World War II. He reported on numerous American and international subjects such as the psychological manipulation of some American POWs during the Korean War in In Every War But One, (W. W. Norton & Co, 1959), a hotly debated book in the anti-Communist 1950s. Based on a five-year U.S. Army study of G.I.s who had been turned against their country in North Korean captivity through indoctrination, it won a Christopher Literary Award. Kinkead had exclusive access to Army specialists who told him in lengthy interviews quoted in the book that almost one-third of the 4,000 American POWs they had studied following repatriation had collaborated in some way with the enemy; 1 in 7 in serious offenses, such as broadcasting anti-American radio messages. 14 had been court-martialed. 21 had refused repatriation and defected to Communist China or North Korea. The Korean War POW scandal resulted in a new Code of Conduct for Members of the Armed Forces of the United States promulgated by President Eisenhower that spelled out soldiers’ duties of loyalty and service in combat and captivity. The causes of collaboration which the Army described to Kinkead continue to be debated, particularly through the lens of trauma, though after the Vietnam War, the Korean conflict was no longer the sole war in which G.I.s collaborated.

== Nature reporting ==
The New Yorker staff naturalist, Kinkead covered city coyotes, big rains, New York’s Central Park, the Ailanthus altissima tree, tiny snail darters and the Endangered Species Act, London’s Kew Gardens, and the prodigious stray cat killer of Brooklyn (anthologized in The New Yorker Big Book of Cats). In his introduction to Spider, Egg, and Microcosm, Kinkead’s 1955 book about Russian-born arachnologist Alexander Petrunkevitch, egg expert Alexis Romanoff, and microbiology photographer Roman Vishniac, E.B. White said: “...I am restored and so will other readers be, to see and hear repeated the miracle of life and feel again its mystery and its antiquity, as sustained and compelling as the toad's note of love in the passionate puddle of his desire...But until I read Mr. Kinkead's account of the egg, in the Romanoff sketch, I never dreamed that my dream of eggs was so weak a dream. This sort of revelation adds fuel to the fires of wonderment." "Cold Light,” a piece on bioluminescence, won Kinkead a second American Association for the Advancement of Science (AAAS) Westinghouse Science Journalism Award. In nature writings, Kinkead is best remembered for Squirrel Book (1980), a lighthearted look at “the furry Einstein of the out-of-doors” which Kirkus Reviews called “a find for fanciers and a reproach to grouches.”

Kinkead and spouse Katharine T. Kinkead, a New Yorker staff writer, were one of several married couples writing for The New Yorker in its early years. They lived in Chappaqua, New York and Truro, Massachusetts, where they occasionally abandoned typewriters for tennis, cocktails, and clam digging in the 1950s-1980s with New Yorker colleagues E.J. Kahn, Bill Maxwell, Bob Shaplen, Philip Hamburger, Geoffrey Hellman, and other neighbors. Kinkead's last assignment for The New Yorker concerned an American documenting reincarnation in India.

== Awards ==
- Christopher Literary Award for In Every War But One
- Benjamin Franklin Award from the University of Illinois for freelance writing in magazines
- 1972 American Association for the Advancement of Science (AAAS) Westinghouse Science Journalism Award for "Cold Light," in The New Yorker

== Selected works ==
=== Books ===
- Kinkead, Eugene; Maloney, Russell (1947). Our Own Baedeker. Simon and Schuster.
- Kinkead, Eugene (June 30, 1955). Spider, Egg, and Microcosm: Three Men and Three Worlds of Science (1st ed.). New York: Alfred A. Knopf. ISBN 0960047611.
- Kinkead, Eugene (1959). In Every War But One. W.W. Norton. ISBN 0313231133.
- Kinkead, Eugene (1974). A Concrete Look at Nature: Central Park (and Other) Glimpses. The New York Times Book Co. ISBN 978-0-8129-0471-0.
- Kinkead, Eugene (1978). Wildness is All Around Us: Notes of an Urban Naturalist. E. P. Dutton. ISBN 978-0-87690-277-6.
- Kinkead, Eugene (1980). Squirrel Book. E. P. Dutton. ISBN 978-0-525-93137-9.
- Kinkead, Eugene (1990). Central Park, 1857-1995. W. W. Norton & Company. ISBN 978-0-393-02531-6.

=== Articles and chapters ===
- White, E. B.; Kinkead, Eugene (January 1933). "Comment". The New Yorker.
- Kinkead, Eugene (August 25, 1944). "The Fires on Saipan". The New Yorker.
- Kinkead, Eugene (August 20, 1945). "Fateful Night". The New Yorker.
- Kinkead, Eugene (December 29, 1945). "Usher. The Pilot who dropped the Atomic Bomb on Hiroshima". The New Yorker.
- Kinkead, Eugene (April 4, 1950). "Arachnologist". The New Yorker. – Alexander Petrunkevitch profile
- Kinkead, Eugene (June 12, 1953). "Egg is All". The New Yorker.
- Kinkead, Eugene (July 1955). "The Tiny Landscape". The New Yorker. – two-part profile of Roman Vishniac on July 2 and 9, 1955
- Kinkead, Eugene (December 3, 1978). "Tennessee Small Fry". The New Yorker.
- Kinkead, Eugene (August 26, 1979). "New and Old at Kew". The New Yorker.
- Kinkead, Eugene (July 1, 1984). "The Original Olympiads". The New Yorker.
- Gibbs, Wolcott; Kinkead, E. F. (2013). "Lady of the Cats". The Big New Yorker Book of Cats. Random House.
