= Crime lab =

Forensic science laboratory

A crime laboratory, often shortened to crime lab, is a scientific laboratory, using primarily forensic science for the purpose of examining evidence from criminal cases.

== Lab personnel ==
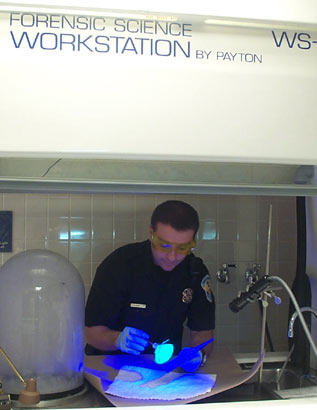
Police officer of the United States Park Police Identification Unit analysing evidence

A typical crime lab has two sets of personnel:

(In some countries some of these may be civilians or officers from the force)

- Field analysts – investigators that go to crime scenes, collect evidence, and process the scene. Job titles include:
  - Forensic evidence technician
  - Crime scene investigator
  - Scenes of crime officer (SOCO)
- Laboratory analysts – scientists or other personnel who run tests on the evidence once it is brought to the lab (i.e., DNA tests, or bullet striations). Job titles include:
  - Forensic Technician (performs support functions such as making reagents)
  - Forensic Scientist/Criminalist (performs scientific analyses on evidence)
  - Fingerprint Analyst
  - Forensic Photographer
  - Forensic Document Examiner
  - Forensic Entomologist

== Crime labs ==
=== United States ===
In the United States, crime labs may be publicly or privately operated, although private laboratories typically do not respond to crime scenes to collect evidence. Public crime labs are organized at the city, state, or national level. A law enforcement agency that operates its own crime lab usually has access to a higher level laboratory for analysis of their evidence. Most states have their own crime labs, for instance Oklahoma has the OSBI, many other places have smaller yet sufficient crime labs. Crime labs simply do not have the funding or personnel resources to keep up with the large influx of cases being brought into the laboratory, as well as the backlog of cases already in existence.

The Los Angeles Police Department founded the first crime laboratory in the United States (1923), followed by the Bureau of Investigation (1926), forerunner to the Federal Bureau of Investigation.

== Crime labs in popular culture ==
The term "crime lab" has become a part of popular culture, largely due to the TV dramas. Some of the more famous shows are:

- Bones
- Castle
- CSI: Crime Scene Investigation and spin-offs CSI: Miami and CSI: NY
- NCIS
- Quincy, M.E. – a 1970s television show featuring crime lab personnel and procedures.

Several non-fiction television programs, document the resolution of criminal cases based on the scientific analysis of the evidence:

- Forensic Files

== Backlogged evidence issues ==
Due to the lack of funding and staff, delays in the ability to test cases has occurred creating a backlog in the analysis of evidence.

=== Rape kit backlog ===
Rape kit backlog refers to the problem of untested sexual assault kits. The problem is twofold: it involves both the issue of rape kits not being submitted to crime labs for testing and the related issue of crime labs not having enough resources to test all of the submitted kits.

== See also ==
- Combined DNA Index System
