= William Kincaid (artist) =

American artist

- Born: 1957 (age 68–69); Chicago, Illinois, U.S.
- Education: Washington University in St. Louis
- Known for: Painting

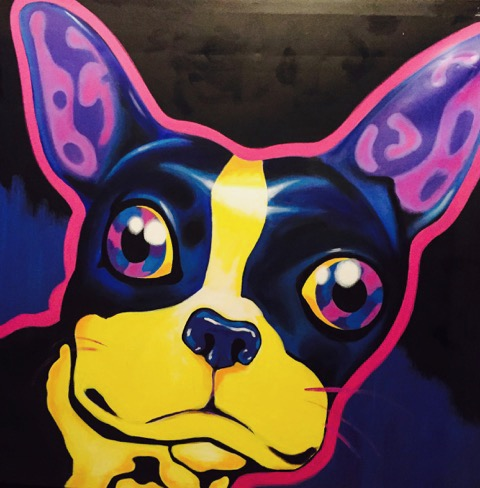

William "Bill" Kincaid (born 1957, in Chicago) is an American artist known for creating pet paintings in brilliant colors on large canvases, and as a costume designer until 1990.

== Education ==
Kincaid attended art class at the Washington University in St. Louis during the early 1980s, although not as an art major.

== Employment ==
After graduating from Washington University, he painted miscellaneous portraits of people, occasional copies of classic paintings, and abstracts in his spare time. He focused on pets after he painted a friend's Boston Terrier. Kincaid's first employment in an art field was in 1974, working as a custom motorcycle artist at "Buzz's Psycles" of Chamblee, Georgia. He painted restorations of classic British bikes such as the Bonnevilles and Trophies built in the middle and late 1960s by Triumph Motorcycles and did customization work. He left Georgia in 1977.

== Influences ==
He has listed as major influences 1960s psychedelia, surrealism and Pop Art; Andy Warhol, Peter Max, Salvador Dalí, and other less-known genre artists. Although the medium, acrylics on canvas, has been consistent throughout his painting career, his painting style has varied throughout a limited body of work.

== Activities ==
From 1977 through 1989, he made thousands of costumes, also drawing and painting costume designs and various commercial graphics projects, in partnership with his brother Doug Kincaid. Bill Kincaid often participated in every step from the initial drawings, patterns and materials selection through the final cutting and assembly.

During his active years with The Kincaid Karacter Company, he was instrumental in the design, development, and creation of many iconic mascot characters for some of the world's best known organizations, including "BUDMAN" & "Spuds MCKENZIE" for Anheuser-Busch (AB-InBev), "FredBird" for The St. Louis Cardinals, "Little Caesar" for Little Caesar's Pizza, and "Elroy Elk", the National Drug Awareness Program mascot for The Benevolent and Protective Order of Elks (ELKS Association). He also designed & created hundreds of other popular mascots for Ralston Purina, Six Flags, Blue Cross/Blue Shield, M-TV, Hostess Cakes, and The United States Postal Service, as well as designing & creating the character of "Grouchie Gator" (star of the CBS children's show "Gator Tales").

His non-costume & puppet related projects included props for numerous TV commercials, promotions, and industrial films, as well as board games, coloring books, and logos. From 1981 to 1999, Kincaid also created puppets, scenery and props for CBS children's television shows D. B.'s Delight and Gator Tales, plus rendered & constructed remodels of sets for Six Flags attractions.

Kincaid specializes in painting dogs, cats and other pets.
