= Playboy Foundation =

American philanthropic organization

The Playboy Foundation is a corporate-giving organization that provides grants to non-profit groups involved in fighting censorship and researching human sexuality. It gives grants and in-kind contributions, such as advertising space in the Playboy magazine to organizations concerned with US First Amendment freedoms. The Playboy Foundation was founded in 1965.
