= Crime Victims Treatment Center =

Rape crisis centre in New York City, USA

The Crime Victims Treatment Center (CVTC) is the first rape crisis center founded in New York City in 1977. It is a 501(c)3 nonprofit in New York City whose mission is to help people heal from violent crime. Their focus is on sexual assault and domestic abuse survivors.

== History ==
In 1977, a violent rape occurred on Columbia University campus. Witnesses called an ambulance, and the young woman was taken to the Emergency Department of St. Luke's Hospital. With no protocol on what to do with rape victims, the doctors transferred her to the Psychiatric Emergency Department. After she was discharged, she left Columbia, and was not connected to any support. After outrage from the community, an emergency department social worker, administrator, a doctor, and several members of the Upper West Side community formed a steering committee was and developed protocols and this first rape crisis center was founded.

In 1986, CVTC became the first victim treatment center to offer psychiatric consultation and medication supervision in its treatment services.

In 1998, CVTC started the first private hospital program in NYC to implement a sexual assault forensic examiner (SAFE) program.

== Programs ==
CVTC offers crisis intervention, individual and group trauma-focused therapy, legal advocacy, complementary therapy and psychiatric consultation.

"CVTC has a diverse staff of New York State licensed and certified professionals includes clinical social workers, a therapist, a psychiatrist, and a legal advocate. All are experts in the treatment of emotional trauma caused by victimization and have a combined total of over 150 years of experience. They also have over 170 dedicated volunteer advocates who are trained to provide emergency room crisis intervention, advocacy and emotional support for sexual assault and domestic violence survivors and their families."

== Funding ==
CVTC is partially funded by the Office of Victims Services as part of the New York State Government.

CVTC holds a yearly gala that honors a new group of survivors and/or advocates each year. Ticket sales go to funding CVTC. In 2025, the gala honorees were Drew Nixon, Evelyn Yang, and E. Jean Carroll.

Some recent years' total fundraising totals have been 5.84 million in 2021, 4.91 million in 2022, and 5.43 million in 2023.
