= DNA Analysis Backlog Elimination Act of 2000 =

United States Act of Congress

- Long title: An Act to make grants to States for carrying out DNA analyses for use in the Combined DNA Index System of the Federal Bureau of Investigation, to provide for the collection and analysis of DNA samples from certain violent and sexual offenders for use in such system, and for other purposes.
- Acronyms (colloquial): DABEA
- Enacted by: the 106th United States Congress
- Effective: December 19, 2000

Citations
- Public law: 106-546
- Statutes at Large: 114 Stat. 2726

Codification
- Titles amended: 42 U.S.C.: Public Health and Social Welfare
- U.S.C. sections amended: 42 U.S.C. ch. 136 §§ 13701, 14135 et seq.

Legislative history
- Introduced in the House as H.R. 4640 by Bill McCollum (R–FL) on June 12, 2000; Committee consideration by House Judiciary, House Armed Services; Passed the House on October 2, 2000 (voice vote); Passed the Senate on December 6, 2000 (unanimous consent) with amendment; House agreed to Senate amendment on December 7, 2000 (unanimous consent); Signed into law by President Bill Clinton on December 19, 2000

Major amendments
- Debbie Smith Act of 2023

The DNA Analysis Backlog Elimination Act of 2000 (H.R. 4640, 42 U.S.C. 14135 et seq.) is a United States Act of Congress that primarily allows US states to carry out DNA analyses for use in the FBI's Combined DNA Index System and to collect and analyse DNA samples.

== DNA samples National index ==
Under the Violent Crime Control and Law Enforcement Act of 1994, 42 U.S.C. § 14132, "Congress authorized the FBI to create a national index of deoxyribonucleic acid (DNA) samples taken from convicted offenders, crime scenes and victims of crime, and unidentified human remains." In response to this congressional mandate, the FBI established the Combined DNA Index System ("CODIS"). The CODIS database provides a means for state and local forensic laboratories to share DNA profiles in an attempt to "link evidence from crime scenes for which there are no suspects to DNA samples of convicted offenders on file in the system."

However, the 1994 Act was interpreted by the FBI to permit only the creation of the CODIS, not the taking of DNA samples of persons convicted of federal offenses for input into the system. Thus, "the FBI requested that Congress enact statutory authority to allow the taking of DNA samples from persons committing Federal crimes of violence, robbery, and burglary, or similar crimes in the District of Columbia or while in the military, and authorizing them to be included in CODIS."

Accordingly, Congress passed the DNA Analysis Backlog Elimination Act of 2000 ("DNA Act"), which authorizes the "Attorney General to make grants to eligible States... to carry out, for the inclusion in the Combined DNA Index System of the Federal Bureau of Investigation, DNA analyses of samples taken from individuals convicted of a qualifying State offenses." Moreover, the DNA Act provides that "the Director of the Bureau of Prisons shall collect a DNA sample from each individual in the custody of the Bureau of Prisons who is, or has been, convicted of a qualifying Federal offense" and that "the probation office responsible for the supervision under Federal law of an individual on probation, parole, or supervised release shall collect a DNA sample from each such individual who is or has been, convicted of a qualifying Federal offense."

In addition, Congress has mandated the collection of DNA samples from "each individual in the custody of the Bureau of Prisons who is, or has been convicted of a qualifying District of Columbia offense" or any "individual under the supervision of the Agency who is on supervised release, parole, or probation who is, or has been convicted of a qualifying District of Columbia offense." Congress left to the District of Columbia the responsibility of determining which offenses under the District of Columbia Code should be deemed qualifying offenses. The District of Columbia has determined that forty-nine separate offense qualify for collection under the DNA Act. These qualifying offense include, for example, arson, aggravated assault, burglary, kidnaping, robbery, attempted robbery, and carjacking.

Once a DNA sample is entered into the CODIS database, the information can be released only (1) "to criminal justice agencies for law enforcement identification purposes;" (2) "in judicial proceedings;" (3) "for criminal defense purposes, to a defendant, who shall have access to samples and analyses performed in connection with the case in which such defendant is charged;" or (4) "if personally identifiable information is removed, for a population statistics database, for identification research and protocol development purposes, or for quality control purposes." In addition, the DNA Act imposes criminal penalties for individuals who improperly disclose sample results or improperly obtains or uses DNA samples.
