= Vallat (surname) =

Vallat is a French surname. Notable people with the surname include:

- Francis Vallat (1912–2008), British international lawyer
- David Vallat (1971–2024), French jihadist
- Jean-Pierre Vallat (1951–2021), French historian and archaeologist
- Xavier Vallat (1891–1972), French politician and antisemite
