= Wang Zhi'an =

Chinese journalist and environmental activist (born 1968)

- 王志安
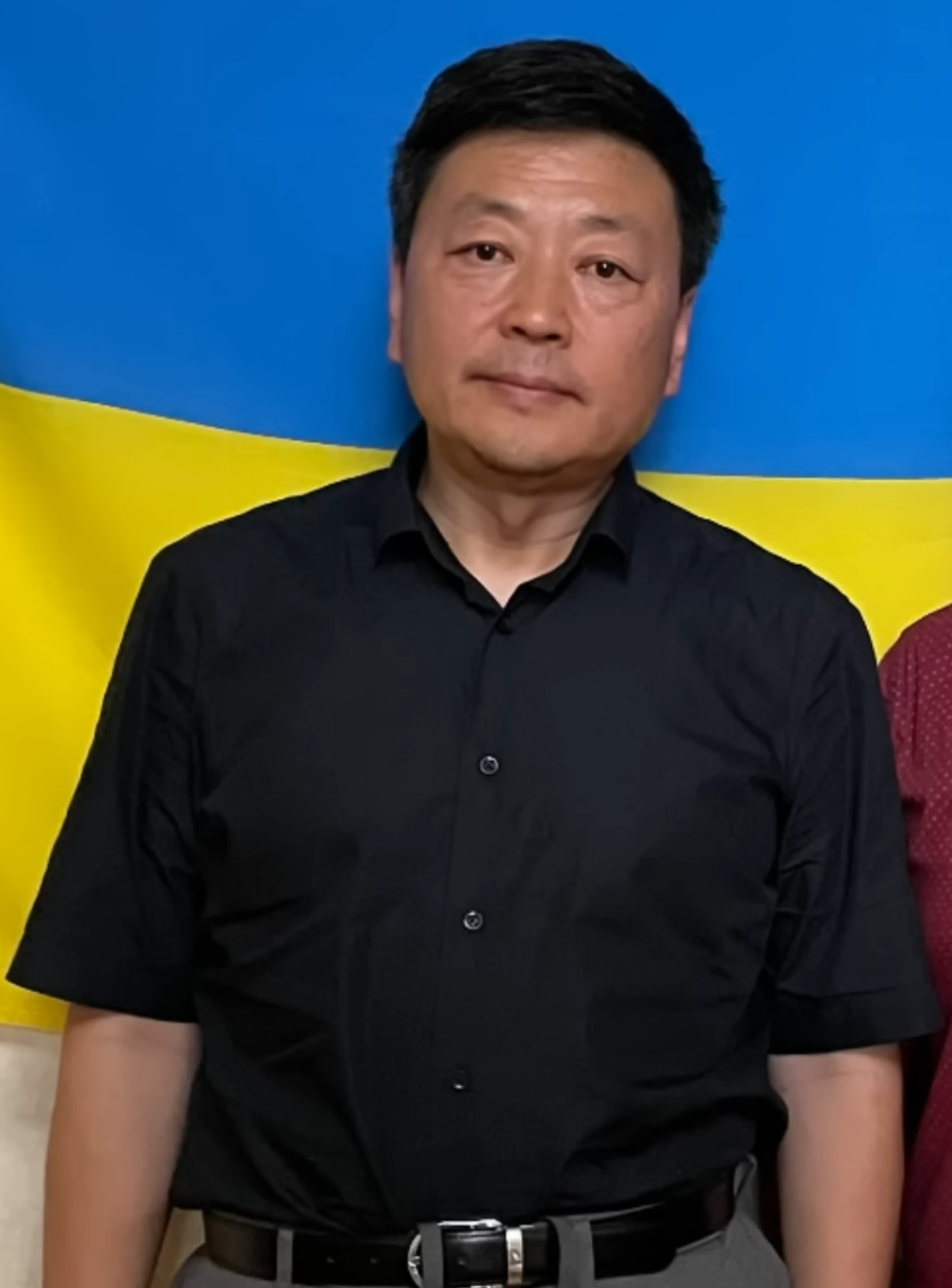
- Wang Zhi'an in 2022
- Born: April 21, 1968 (age 58); Jilin City, Jilin Province, China
- Other name: Director Wang (王局)
- Education: Wuhan University; Peking University
- Occupation: Journalist
- Spouse: Li Ting (divorced)

YouTube information
- Channel: 王志安
- Subscribers: 1.98 million
- Views: 1078 million
- Last updated: May 3, 2025

Wang Zhi'an (Chinese: 王志安; pinyin: Wáng Zhì'ān; born on April 21, 1968) is a Japan-based Chinese journalist. He was an investigative reporter at China Central Television from 1998 to 2015, after which he was chief investigative reporter at The Beijing News. He was banned from the Chinese internet in 2019. After moving to Japan in 2021, he has worked as an independent reporter. In May 2022, he launched his YouTube talk show Wang Ju Pai An. In 2024, he was banned from entering Taiwan for five years for violating the terms of his tourist visa by appearing on a television show.

== Career ==
=== CCTV (1998–2015) ===
At China Central Television, Wang produced the documentary television program News Probe. He reported on ambulance corruption but left CCTV in 2015 when he was not allowed to air it.

=== The Beijing News (2017–2019) ===
In 2017, Wang served as the chief investigative reporter and hosted a web talk show for The Beijing News. The first season interviewed Xu Xiaodong, Zhou Libo, and Cao Dewang.

=== YouTuber (Since 2020) ===
He was banned from the Internet in mainland China in 2019. In January 2020, Wang moved to Japan, where he worked with Tokyo Fuko Corporation, a self media company founded in 2020. He also became active on Twitter, YouTube and TikTok. On May 2, 2022, he started hosting a news talk show Wang Ju Pai An (王局拍案) on YouTube. In July of the same year, he went to Ukraine to cover the Russian invasion. He was the only mainland Chinese reporter in Ukraine besides Phoenix TV. In September 2022, he went to Tokyo to film the state funeral of Shinzo Abe, as well as a series of special reports on the Fukushima nuclear accident. Since October 2022, he has been interviewed or reported by the Associated Press, NHK World-Japan, Radio Free Asia, CBS News and SWI swissinfo.

== Controversies ==
=== 2024 talkshow controversy ===
In January 2024, Wang stayed two weeks in Taiwan, producing reports on the 2024 Taiwanese elections. He appeared on The Night Night Show with Hello hosted by Hello Hor on 20 January, which Taiwan's National Immigration Agency later found to be a violation of the terms of his tourist visa, resulting in his five-year ban.

==== Prelude ====
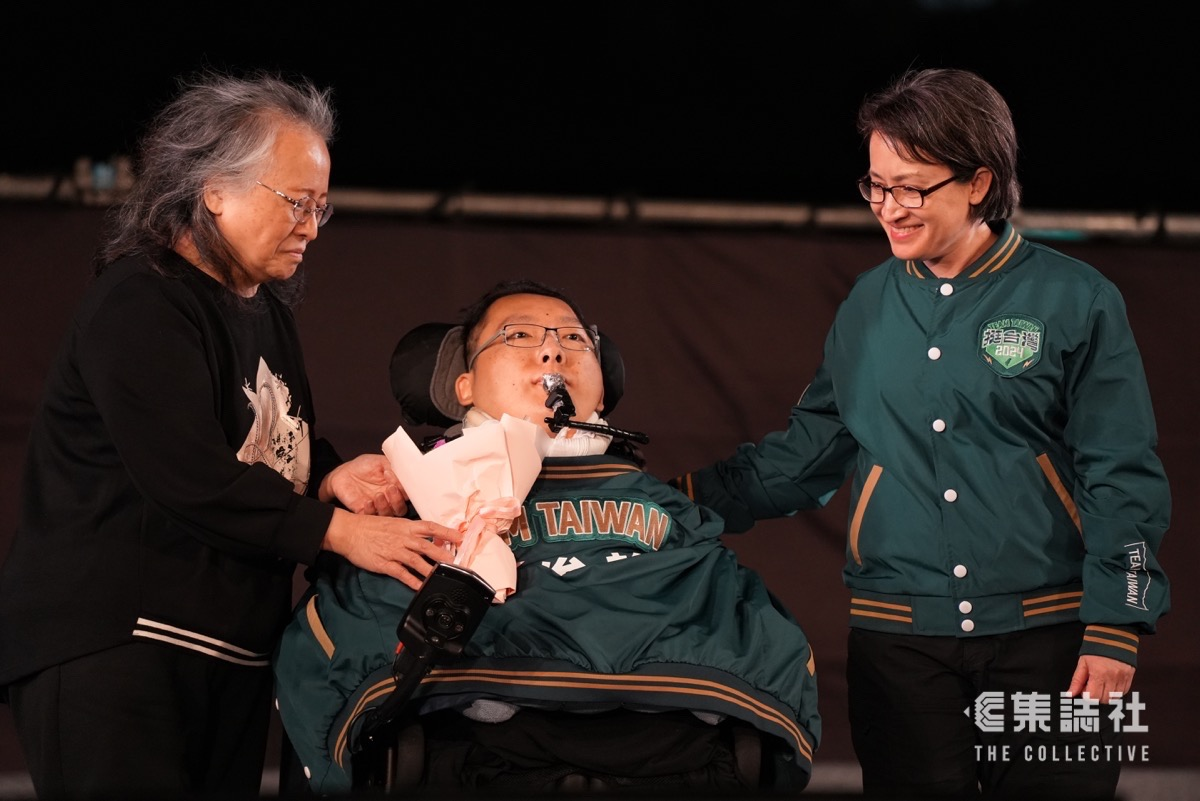
Lawyer Chen Chun-han of the DPP at an election rally

Wang had visited a DPP rally on 12 January, during which he witnessed a speech by Chen Chun-han, a disabled legislative candidate. At the scene, Wang described the circa 5-minute segment as "part of common emotive calls to mobilisation in the Taiwanese electoral process". He commented, "Personally speaking, I don't fancy this tactic. If you really care about these people with disabilities, why don't you give this person a higher position on the party list? Why do you put him 16th? Put him 5th, then for sure he will be elected. Put him 16th, it's actually very hard to enter the legislature." (Note: "就我自己个人角度来讲，不太喜欢这种方式。如果你真的是要在乎这些身体残障的人，那你为什么不把这个人的不分区排名往前靠呢？你为什么把他放到第16名呢？你把他放到第五名，那肯定能当选。你放到第16名，这个位置实际上几乎很难进入国会。")

==== Incident ====
In the appearance, Wang made remarks about Taiwanese politics. Criticising what he perceived as overly lavish and pompous campaigning from the two main parties – DPP and KMT, he likened campaign venues to "walking onto the wrong movie set." Wang remarked, "There are rockstars, and people that do the foreshadowing; and there is emotional mobilisation using disabled people on-stage." (Note: "有歌星、还有前面铺垫的，还有把残疾人推上去煽情的。") He then briefly imitated a paralysed man with a jerking head movement, saying, "Support the DPP! Save Wang Yi-chuan!" (Note: "支持民进党，抢救王义川！") It aroused laughter from the audience, and was included in the first version published on 22 January, which has been replaced since then by a version omitting the clip. The show's producers apologised for the initial publication.

On 23 January, Chang Chih-hao, a DPP spokesperson, said the DPP "condemns" the appearance as "a mocking of Taiwan's democracy", (Note: "一個中國人對臺灣的民主說三道四") and that "ridicule of rally speakers" were "vicious comments". He also said to Taiwanese media that equality for disabled people was a core value of the DPP, and that the DPP was committed to establishing a comprehensive regime for disabled people and realising equal rights.

In a tweet on 24 January, Wang refuted the spokesperson's comments and accused the DPP of instrumentalising disabled people as "election tools". Subsequent tweets also criticised the DPP's "pressuring" of the talkshow.

==== Aftermath ====
On 24 January, an anonymous Chinese-language X account began publicising personal information of Wang and his media employees including addresses and pictures of their offices, vowing a "revelation campaign". It further claimed fraudulent business dealings by Wang in his media venture. The tweets have gathered up to 233,000 views (as of 27 January, 01:00 UTC).

On 26 January, Wang published a video expressing his apologies to Chen Chun-han and "people with disabilities in Taiwan who feel offended", and sarcastically mocked the DPP, "I should have actually just eulogised the DPP after arriving in Taiwan: to eulogise the DPP as not only the light of the Taiwanese democratic system, but also the light of Chinese-speaking peoples, the light of the world, the light of Asia, and the light of the universe". (Note: Timestamp 13:22–15:04) He reported instances of physical stalking after the publicisation of the personal information, purportedly causing some of his team to refrain from work that day and express intentions of termination. "I think that the CCP will not vigorously hunt me down right now [...]. I also think that the DPP will not hunt me down using their means in Japan. The people who would hunt me down are most probably Falun Gong groups, for I offended them a while back. [...] Secondly, it's those particular groups in the Chinese diaspora in Japan; I know this well. They are precisely using these means of doxxing to publicise my personal information", he said. He indicated his plans to relocate the offices, and to contact Japanese police.

Chen died on 11 February 2024 following cold complications. After media reports on 15 February about the death, Wang posted on Twitter what he claimed to have been an apology letter destined for Chen drafted "half a month ago", but which had not been sent. In the same letter addressed to Chen, Wang had pledged to donate 1 million yen ($7091 in 2023) to the Taiwan Foundation for Rare Disorders (TFRD). On 16 February, TFRD published a statement rejecting the donation − received before the Lunar New Year holidays − and claiming to have reimbursed it "after discovering through internet searches" that it was from Wang.

=== Allegations by former wife of deceptive divorce ===
Wang Zhian's former wife, Li Ting, previously worked at the Institute of Atmospheric Physics, Chinese Academy of Sciences. She had more than 8.3 million followers on Sina Weibo, is a member of the China Popular Science Writers Association (中国科普作家协会), holds a Ph.D., and has published more than one hundred popular science articles on atmospheric physics and meteorology under the pen name "大脸撑在小胸上".

Li alleged that Wang had asked her to withdraw from the internet, saying that "the two people in our family can't both be in the public spotlight." She also claimed that he concealed their marriage, persuaded her to resign from her prestigious position at the Chinese Academy of Sciences, and convinced her to relocate to Japan.

On the evening of 9 March 2025, Li entered Wang's Tokyo studio and livestreamed her claim that she had been pressured into divorce. Wang subsequently appeared in the livestream, accused Li of trespassing, and called the police. He shouted at her, saying, "Get out. You've been staying in our house for nine days already. Look how frightened you've made our child. You're going to prison." The livestream was then cut off by staff members who attempted to calm the situation.

The following day, Li livestreamed again, alleging that Wang had deceived her into resigning from her job and moving to Japan. She said that she had sacrificed her own career prospects and public influence to support her husband's career, only to be asked to sign a divorce agreement less than two months after relocating. Li further claimed that, during the divorce proceedings, Wang had promised not to have any more children so that their child "could receive all of her father's love." She said that this promise had been broken and that she felt betrayed. In addition, she accused Wang of having physically abused her while they were living in China.

Wang later issued a lengthy statement responding to the allegations. He denied ever committing domestic violence against Li, although he acknowledged that physical altercations had occurred between them. He also stated that Li had suffered from depression, and that relocating to Japan was intended both to provide her with a more comfortable environment conducive to recovery and to benefit their child's education. Wang said that the primary reason for the divorce was "personality differences." He further stated that, after the two signed their first divorce agreement in February 2021, he moved out and stayed at a guesthouse owned by a friend. Wang also denied violating the divorce agreement, stating: "The divorce proceedings were handled with the assistance of a lawyer and an interpreter, both of whom can attest that there was no deception during our negotiations. The final agreement was also submitted to the Tokyo District Court." Regarding child support, he stated that his financial contributions were not limited to the monthly payment of ¥84,000, but also included other expenses incurred by Li and their daughter.

=== Defamation dispute with Chen Guangcheng ===
On 7 February 2026, Chen Guangcheng announced that he would file a defamation lawsuit against Wang Zhian in Tokyo, seeking ¥330 million in damages. Chen alleged that Wang had defamed him in a video published in 2025 by claiming that he was not actually blind, and stated that the remarks had seriously damaged his reputation and personal dignity. On 10 February, the case was heard before the Tokyo District Court.

Neither Chen nor Wang appeared in court on the day of the hearing. Only Chen's three legal representatives were present. After hearing submissions from Chen's attorneys, the judge adjourned the proceedings until 7 April and ordered Wang to submit his response to the court by 31 March. Failure to do so could result in a default judgment against him.

== See also ==
- Investigative journalism
- News Probe
