= Hello Hor =

Taiwanese stand-up comedian (born 1994)

- 賀瓏
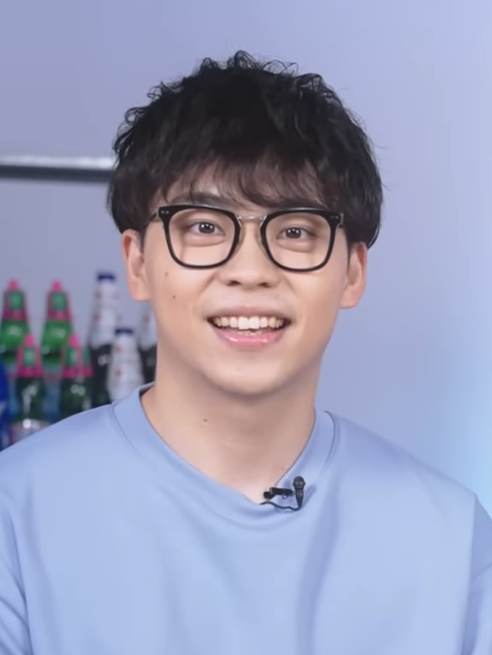
- Hor in June 2023
- Born: Hor Lung; 3 April 1994 (age 32); Taipei, Taiwan
- Education: National Chengchi University (BEcon)
- Occupation: Comedian
- Years active: 2014–present

Hello Hor Lung (Chinese: 賀瓏; born 3 April 1994) is a Taiwanese stand-up comedian. He began his career with live comedy shows at the Live Comedy Club Taipei in 2014, and joined STR Network in 2018, becoming a writer and guest host of the network's flagship show The Night Night Show with Brian Tseng (2018–2020), which received over 10 million views on average per season. In 2023, Hor took over as the lead host of the show, rebranding it as The Night Night Show with Hello (2023–present).

== Early life and education ==
Hor was born on 3 April 1994 in Taipei, Taiwan. His father is a Hongkonger, and his mother is Taiwanese. He grew up in Taipei, and studied at the Affiliated Senior High School of National Taiwan Normal University, where he joined the school's recreational guidance association and was introduced to comedy. He later attended National Chengchi University to study economics. At the age of 20, he began performing as a stand-up comedian at Live Comedy Club Taipei during his sophomore year. He also served as a recurring host for the university student-themed talk show College Talk in 2014. He graduated with a Bachelor of Economics and became a full-time comedian in 2017.

== Career ==
=== Early ventures and joining STR Network (2017–2022) ===
In his early days as a stand-up comedian, Hor averaged about five shows per month, which was barely enough to make a living. In 2018, he was invited by Brian Tseng to join STR Network, a comedy entertainment studio. He worked as a writer for all three seasons of STR Network's flagship show, The Night Night Show with Brian Tseng, and served as a guest host in the third season. The show was a viewership success, averaging over ten million views per season, with the highest-rated episode reaching over 8.02 million views as of October 2023. In 2020, Hor also hosted his first stand-up comedy tour Ignoring You in collaboration with STR Network.

In 2022, Hor was invited to host the 4th Walk Bell John Awards. That same year, he launched his second stand-up tour Whatever She Says. He also served as a recurring host and adjudicator on Sanlih E-Television's music contest program The Rappers 2, and appeared on Sanlih's All Star Let's Debate.

=== The Night Night Show with Hello (2023–present) ===
In 2023, Hor was announced as the lead host of STR Network's flagship show, rebranded as The Night Night Show with Hello. With the show coinciding with the 2024 Taiwanese presidential election, numerous politicians from different factions were invited as guests, including Kuomintang's vice presidential candidate Jaw Shaw-kong, Taiwan People's Party's vice presidential candidate Cynthia Wu, legislator Huang Kuo-chang, Democratic Progressive Party's legislator Kao Chia-yu, and New Power Party's chairperson Claire Wang. Chen Chi-nung of Taipei Times noted that the show's popularity stemmed from its racy content and sarcastic take on politics, resembling TikTok videos and appealing to young viewers. The episode featuring Jaw Shaw-kong broke viewership records, premiering with about 29,000 views and accumulating over 1.28 million views within two days, surpassing the previous record set by Taiwan People's Party presidential candidate Ko Wen-je when he appeared on The Night Night Show with Brian Tseng. In gratitude, Jaw invited Hor to attend the vice presidential debate.

On 22 January, the show faced controversy following an episode featuring Chinese investigative journalist Wang Zhi'an, who criticized Taiwan's presidential elections as "concerts and stage performances" and ridiculed the Democratic Progressive Party for nominating disabled legislative candidate Chen Chun-han, who suffers from spinal muscular atrophy. The show received public backlash, prompting Hor to apologize on 27 January for failing to curtail the guest's inappropriate comments. Following the controversy and calls for a boycott online, the show's views experienced a slight decline, recording roughly 640,000 views within 15 hours after the premiere of the subsequent satirical news report episode. The show concluded later that month, with its final guest interview featuring television personality Jacky Wu, which attracted about 770,000 views in a day. A second season had been confirmed in May 2024, but the theme would shift to entertainment, music, and drama due to the political controversies faced in the first season. Hor also co-hosted his first stand-up comedy world tour Storm in a Bubble Tea Cup alongside Brian Tseng starting in May 2024, and made a cameo appearance in the horror comedy film Dead Talents Society released in the same year.

== Personal life ==
Hor briefly dated fellow stand-up comedian Lung Lung prior to 2021. Their breakup led to controversy after Old Kay, another STR Network comedian, made negative comments about Lung regarding her relationship with Hor during a show, and Lung expressed discontent and demanded an apology during a livestream and in an interview with Apple Daily. Her response received public attention, with opinions divided as both sides garnered supporters, leading to public debates that lasted for about six months. The media dubbed the controversy the "Lung K Incident". In February 2024, Brian Tseng, the founder and CEO of STR Network, filmed a video in which he apologized to Lung Lung.

== Filmography ==
=== Stand-up comedy tours ===
- Ignoring You (2020)
- Whatever She Says (2022)
- Storm in a Bubble Tea Cup (2024; with Brian Tseng)

=== Variety shows ===
Year	Title	Network	Notes
2014–2016	College Talk	CTi Variety	Host
2018–2020	The Night Night Show with Brian Tseng	STR Network	Writer (season 1–3), guest host (season 3)
2023	The Rappers 2	Sanlih E-Television	Host
2023	All Star Let's Debate	Sanlih E-Television	Celebrity debater
2023	G8 Summit	STR Network & Catchplay+	Host
2023–present	The Night Night Show with Hello	STR Network	Host (season 1–2)

=== Films ===
Year	Title	Role	Notes
2021	I Missed You	Delivery man	Cameo
2024	Dead Talents Society	Underworld news anchor	Cameo
