= Ming Fan =

Chinese investigative documentary filmmaker

Ming Fan (Chinese: 范铭; pinyin: Fàn Míng) is a senior investigative TV producer at China Central TV and an independent documentary filmmaker. Her career has focused covering a variety of complex and difficult issues in China.

She is known for her role as the director of the documentary about air pollution in China titled Under the Dome. In just one week, 300 million people in China watched the documentary that the well-known Chinese anchor Chai Jing presented, which ultimately improved China's environmental policy. China's newest environmental protection minister, Chen Jining, hailed the film as the country's "Silent Spring" moment. Some media called the film "Top 10 most disturbing documentaries of all time" The documentary has been included in the Global Environmental Justice Documentaries Project, which is based in the USA and Canada and supported by the International Documentary Association

Another documentary film The Sinking of the Lisbon Maru, which she co-directed and co-produced, has been selected by China for submission in the Best International Feature Film category at the 97th Academy Awards in 2024.

== Education ==
Her education began with a focus on Chinese literature studies at Nanjing University, leading to various fellowships and scholarly pursuits worldwide. She is one of the Asia 21 Fellows, Class of 2009, organized by The Asia 21 Young Leaders Initiative, and received the Asia Journalism Fellowship in 2010.

She is a Mason Fellow and got her MPA at Harvard Kennedy School in 2017. She became a visiting scholar at the School of Film & New Media, Tokyo University of the Arts in 2023, and a visiting scholar and adjunct assistant professor at the Columbia University Graduate School of Journalism in 2024, two of her documentary film works have been collected by the East Asia library of Columbia University.

== Career ==
=== TV Producer of News Probe ===
She started her journalism journey as a TV director of CCTV's investigative program, News Probe, a documentary television program that has aired on China Central Television (CCTV) since 1996. The show is known for its investigative journalism, exploring various news stories, issues, and scandals with the aim of revealing social problems and inadequacies in state policies. Her coverage includes LGBT rights, public health, corruption, domestic violence, environmental protection, and miscarriages of justice. Her early work, "The Unnatural Death of a Cat" investigated am infamous incident in China's powerful Internet culture, and received the 2006 Special Jury Award from the China Documentary Association. Another piece, "In the Name of Life," was the first show to cover the real life of homosexuals in China, and won the 2006 Chinese Academic Award for best TV documentary.

=== Editor in Chief of Insight at CCTV ===
She was chief editor of Insight (看见; Kànjiàn) of CCTV, an investigative, in-depth weekly program that interviews people in the news, hosted by notable journalist Chai Jing, which has had a considerable impact on public discourse in China, with its ability to shape opinions and spark discussions on a broad range of topics. From current affairs and social issues to human-interest stories, the show provides viewers with a fresh perspective and a deeper understanding of the world around them, which earned the 2013 Student's Favorite Humanities TV Program award.

=== Independent documentaries ===
Besides Under the Dome, she is also the co-director of the documentary film The Sinking of the Lisbon Maru, which had a special screening in London. This anti-war documentary follows a lesser-known WWII hellship "Lisbon Maru" linked to Japan, Britain, the US, and China. After placing full-page ads in British newspapers like The Times, The Telegraph, The Guardian, and The Sunday Post, the crew was able to contact more than 380 POW families, interview 120 of them, and collect a massive amount of information (evidence, recordings, diaries, letters) to reconstruct the dark history, resulting in a loss of 828 British PoWs. This documentary film was released in Chinese cinemas, received a 9.3 rating on Douban (China's equivalent of IMDb), making it the highest-rated Chinese film of 2024, and has been selected by China for submission in the Best International Feature Film category at the 97th Academy Awards in 2024.

The latest documentary she directed is Stranger - Talking to Jihadists, which is a first-person account of the famous Chinese investigative journalist, Chai Jing, who, as a stranger to Europe and trained journalist, talks with dozens of jihadists, mentor-recruiters, radicalized young people, family members of victims, academics, and right-wing political parties after her family's own experience of the terrorist attacks in Europe in an attempt to understand the underlying psychological, political, and religious reasons for the successive, inhumane terrorist attacks and to reveal how people become fanatical and alienated and ultimately become the "Strangers (Ghuraba in Arabic)" that the ideology of Jihadism demands and defines them to be. On August 13, the trailer posted on WeChat was quickly blocked.

According to WikiLeaks, Ming Fan was detained in October 2008 after directing a documentary that exposed the corruption and deep-rooted historical reasons behind the collapse of shoddy school buildings that led to the deaths of more than 5,000 students in the May 2008 Wenchuan earthquake, as well as problems with the Sichuan provincial government's response to the post-disaster rehabilitation and accountability. The documentary was an independent project with no affiliation to China Central Television (CCTV).

In 2020, she served as a jury member of the 2nd Dongbuzhou International Animation Festival and the 9th China Independent Animation Film Forum. In June 2024, she became one of the judges for the 45th Emmy Awards in the 'News and Documentary' category.
