= Lisbon Maru =

Japanese cargo liner and troopship

Coordinates: 30.23°N 122.77°E

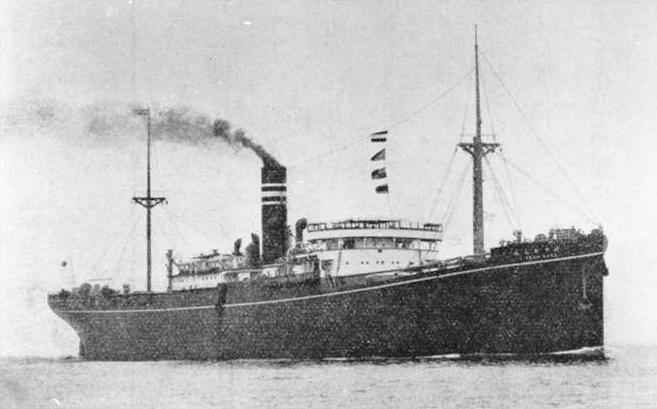
- Lisbon Maru

History

Japan
- Name: SS Lisbon Maru
- Namesake: Port of Lisbon
- Owner: Nippon Yusen Kaisha
- Builder: Yokohama Dock Company, Yokohama
- Laid down: 15 October 1919
- Launched: 31 May 1920
- Completed: 8 July 1920
- Fate: Sunk, 1 October 1942

General characteristics
- Class & type: Cargo liner
- Tonnage: 7,053 GRT
- Length: 135.6 m (444 ft 11 in)
- Beam: 17.7 m (58 ft 1 in)
- Depth: 10.4 m (34 ft 1 in)
- Installed power: 632 nhp
- Propulsion: 2 × triple expansion steam engines
- Speed: 12 knots (22 km/h; 14 mph)

Lisbon Maru (りすぼん丸) was a Japanese cargo liner built at Yokohama in 1920 for a Japanese shipping line. During World War II, the ship was requisitioned by the Japanese Army and turned into an armed troopship. On her final voyage, Lisbon Maru was being used to transport prisoners of war (POWs) between Hong Kong and Japan when it was torpedoed by the submarine USS Grouper on 1 October 1942.

Over 800 British POWs died in the sinking, either by drowning or being shot by Japanese soldiers as they attempted to escape from the sinking ship. About 384 British POWs were rescued by nearby Chinese fishermen.

== Construction and commercial service ==
Lisbon Maru was completed on 8 July 1920 at the Yokohama Dock Company shipyard in Yokohama, Japan as Yard No. 70, entering service for a major Japanese shipping line, Nippon Yusen Kabushiki Kaisha, and registered at the port of Tokyo.

The ship was 445 feet (135.6 metres) long, with a beam of 58 ft (17.7 m) and a depth of 34 ft (10.4 m). It measured 7,053 gross register tons (GRT) and 4,308 net register tons (NRT). Twin propellers were powered by a pair of triple expansion steam engines with a combined rating of 632 nominal horsepower, giving a service speed of 12 knots (22 km/h; 14 mph). The engines and four boilers were made by the shipbuilder.

== Sinking and rescue ==
On her final voyage, Lisbon Maru was carrying 700 Japanese Army personnel and 1,816 British prisoners of war captured after the Battle of Hong Kong in December 1941. The POWs were held in "appalling conditions ... [those] at the bottom of the hold ... showered by the diarrhoea of sick soldiers above".

On 1 October 1942, the ship was torpedoed by the submarine USS Grouper while travelling through the East China Sea. (The ship was not marked to alert Allied forces to the nature of its passengers.) The Japanese troops were evacuated from the ship but the POWs were not; instead the hatches were battened down above them and they were left on the listing ship. After 24 hours, as it became apparent that the ship was sinking, the POWs were able to break through the hatch covers. Some were able to escape from the ship before it sank. The ladder from one of the holds to the deck failed, and the Royal Artillery POWs in the hold could not escape; they were last heard singing "It's a Long Way to Tipperary". Survivors reported that Japanese guards first fired on the POWs who reached the deck; and that other Japanese ships used machine guns to fire at POWs who were in the water. Later, however, after some Chinese fishermen started rescuing survivors, the Japanese ships also rescued survivors.

The sinking occurred near the Zhoushan archipelago, close to the islands of Qingbang and Miaozihu. Upon noticing the black smoke and debris from the wreck, local fishermen from these islands sailed out to rescue survivors, saving a total of 384 POWs. As more fishing boats approached the wreck site, Japanese ships, which had been shooting at the British POWs in the water, began to pick up survivors. The 384 British POWs rescued by Chinese fishermen were taken into their homes and temples on the islands, where they were provided with food and clothing. Three days later, Japanese gunboats landed on these islands and recaptured 381 of them, while three were hidden and protected by the local residents. These three, eventually made their way back to the United Kingdom via Chongqing, the wartime capital of China, in early 1943.

Over 800 of these men died either directly as a result of the sinking, or from being shot or otherwise killed by the Japanese guards while swimming away from the wreck.

== Aftermath ==
Kyoda Shigeru, master of Lisbon Maru, was tried in Hong Kong between 23 October and 29 November 1946 for a war crime relating to his actions during the sinking. Specifically, ordering the British POWs be closed in the ship holds and failing to provide them with life jackets. He was found guilty and sentenced to seven years in prison. Shigeru was released early and returned to Japan. Wada Yoshio, who was in charge of the prisoners, died during the war.

On January 3, 2021, Dennis Morley, the last known survivor of the Lisbon Maru, died at the age of 101 due to COVID-19.

== Memorials ==
A Lisbon Maru memorial is located in the chapel of St Stephen's College in Hong Kong. The memorial was originally placed in Stanley Fort, but was moved to St Stephen's College with Hong Kong's change in sovereignty.

A reunion of Lisbon Maru survivors was held on board HMS Belfast on 2 October 2007 to mark the 65th anniversary of their escape. Six former prisoners attended, alongside many families of the escapees.

In 2021, a memorial for Lisbon Maru was placed at the National Memorial Arboretum in Staffordshire, and the unveiling was attended by over 650 family members and military personnel to remember those who died.

A memorial was unveiled in 2025 on Qingbang Island, south east of Shanghai. It was created after the descendant of one of the British prisoners wrote directly to General Secretary of the Chinese Communist Party Xi Jinping, wanting to honour the local fishermen who helped save the survivors.

== In popular culture ==
The album Tarot Sport by the British electronic band Fuck Buttons features a track named "The Lisbon Maru". Band member Benjamin John Power's grandfather survived the torpedoing of the ship. The album War, Peace and Diplomacy by Tom Hickox features a track named "The Lisbon Maru", in which a survivor of the sinking relays his tale to a barman.

The documentary film The Sinking of the Lisbon Maru, produced and directed by Fang Li, was released in September 2024 in mainland China, covering the stories of the families affected by the tragedy and shedding light on the rescue of British POWs by Chinese fishermen.

The 2025 Chinese film Dongji Rescue is a fictionalized account of the sinking of Lisbon Maru.

== See also ==
- List by death toll of ships sunk by submarines
- MV Awa Maru
- SS Cap Arcona
- Laconia incident
