= Abdoulaye Soumaré (soldier) =

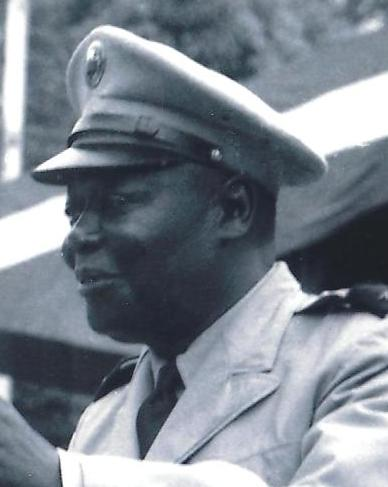
- Soumaré in 1964

Chief of Staff of the Malian Armed Forces
- In office December 28, 1960 – October 2, 1964
- Preceded by: Sekou Traoré
- Succeeded by: Sekou Traoré

Chief of Staff of the Armed Forces of the Mali Federation
- In office July 30, 1960 – August 20, 1960
- Preceded by: Position established
- Succeeded by: Position abolished

Personal details
- Born: January 12, 1905 Saint-Louis, French West Africa (now Senegal)
- Died: October 2, 1964 (aged 59) 8th arrondissement of Paris, France
- Resting place: Saint-Louis Cemetery, Saint-Louis, Senegal

Military service
- Allegiance: French Army (1925–1959); Mali Federation (1959–1960); Mali (1960–1964)
- Rank: Brigadier general
- Unit: 2nd Senegalese Tiralleurs Regiment (1925–1959)

Abdoulaye Soumaré was a Malian soldier who served as the first and only chief of staff of the Armed Forces of the Mali Federation between 1959 and 1960 and the second chief of staff of the Malian Armed Forces between 1960 and 1964. He is known for laying the groundwork that built the modern day Malian Army.

== Biography ==
Soumaré was born on January 12, 1905, in Saint-Louis, French West Africa (now Saint-Louis, Senegal). (Note: Or October 1, according to Hawa Semega.) He is the son of Babacar Soumaré, a civil administrator, and Diao N'Diaye, a housewife. His family is originally from Kayes Region, in what is now Mali. Soumaré studied in France at Saint-Maixent Military Academy.

He joined the French Army at the age of 20 in 1925, serving in the 2nd Senegalese Tirailleurs Regiment. Initially assigned to Markala, he later was stationed in Dakar. In 1959, he was appointed colonel of the Army of French Sudan. Upon the creation of the Mali Federation in 1959, he was appointed Chief of Staff of the Armed Forces by Modibo Keïta, a Malian. However, vice-president Mamadou Dia, a Senegalese, appointed Amadou Fall to the same position, sparking tensions. Furthermore, Soumaré and Fall had opposite objectives; Soumaré wanted to decrease Malian dependency on France, while Fall opposed this. Soumaré refused to sign the decree that would appoint Fall to his position, despite being constitutionally required to do so. This event, which took place on July 30, helped provoke the collapse of the Mali Federation less than a month later.

When the Mali Federation split into the two states of Senegal and Mali, Soumaré was arrested and imprisoned for a month. He was then extradited to France, where the French government put himunder house arrest in Perpignan. A few weeks later, Keita sent a letter to France asking that Soumaré be allowed to return to Mali and serve in the Malian Armed Forces. He reiterated his request in person in a visit to Paris later on. Soumaré was then appointed a French advisor to the Malian government on December 23, 1960. Five days later however, he was appointed Chief of Staff of the Malian Armed Forces. At the same time, he was promoted to Brigadier General.

After 1961, Soumaré was active in forming the Malian Armed Forces, which he sought to compose entirely of Malians. To achieve this, he called on Malian-born soldiers fighting for the French in Algeria to come home.

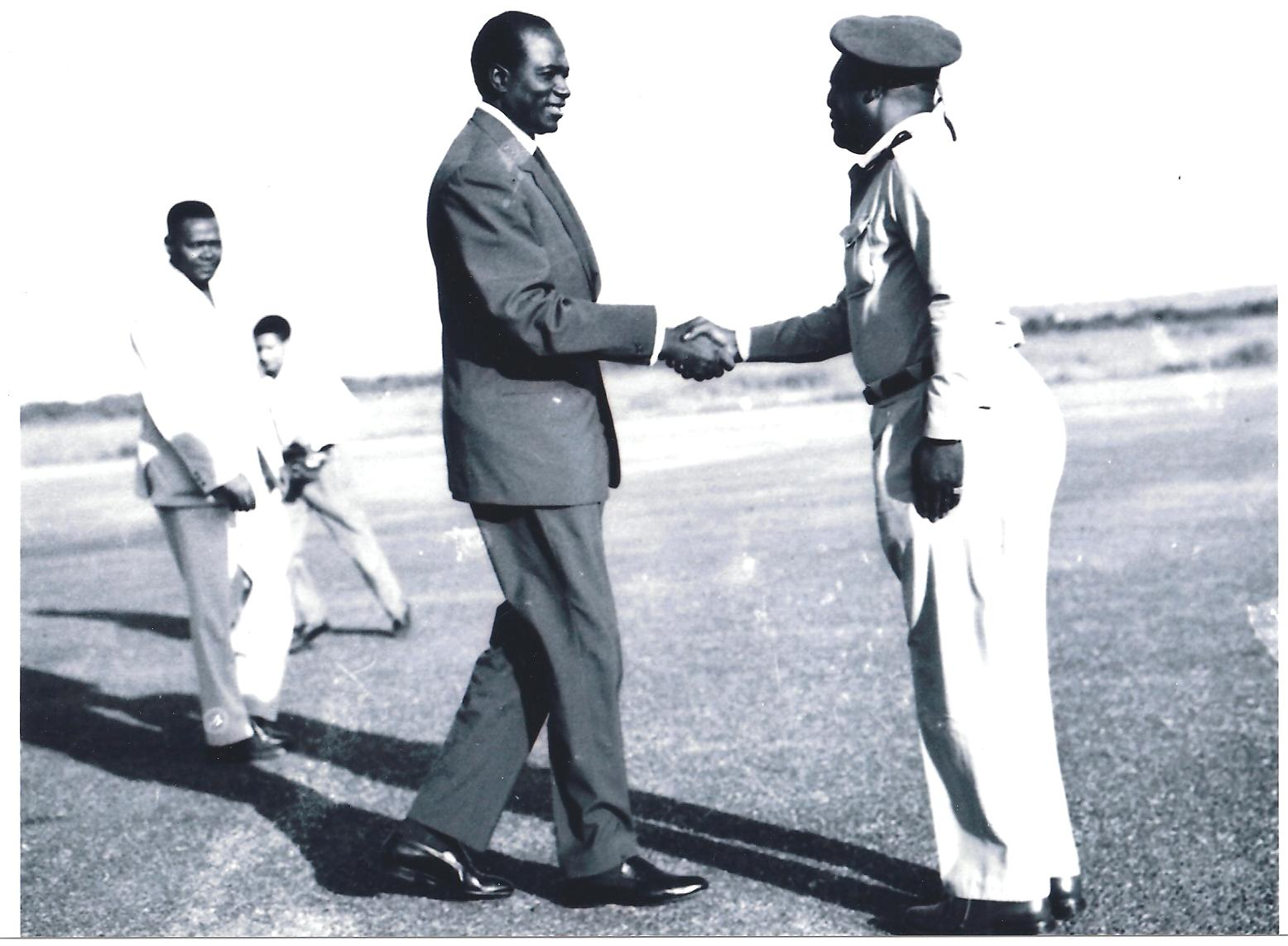
Soumaré greeting Modibo Keita in 1963.

== Death and legacy ==
Soumaré died on October 2, 1964, at the age of 59 in the 8th arrondissement of Paris in France. He is buried at the cemetery in Saint-Louis, Senegal. Soumaré was succeeded by Sekou Traoré as chief of staff.

He was the father of several children, and his eldest daughter married French historian Jean-Pierre Vallat. One of his sons was an advisor to Amadou Toumani Touré, and is a diplomat.

One of the river ships of the Malian Navigation Company was named the General Abdoulaye Soumaré in 1964. On January 20, 2011, President Amadou Toumani Touré erected a monument to Soumaré in Bamako.

== Gallery ==
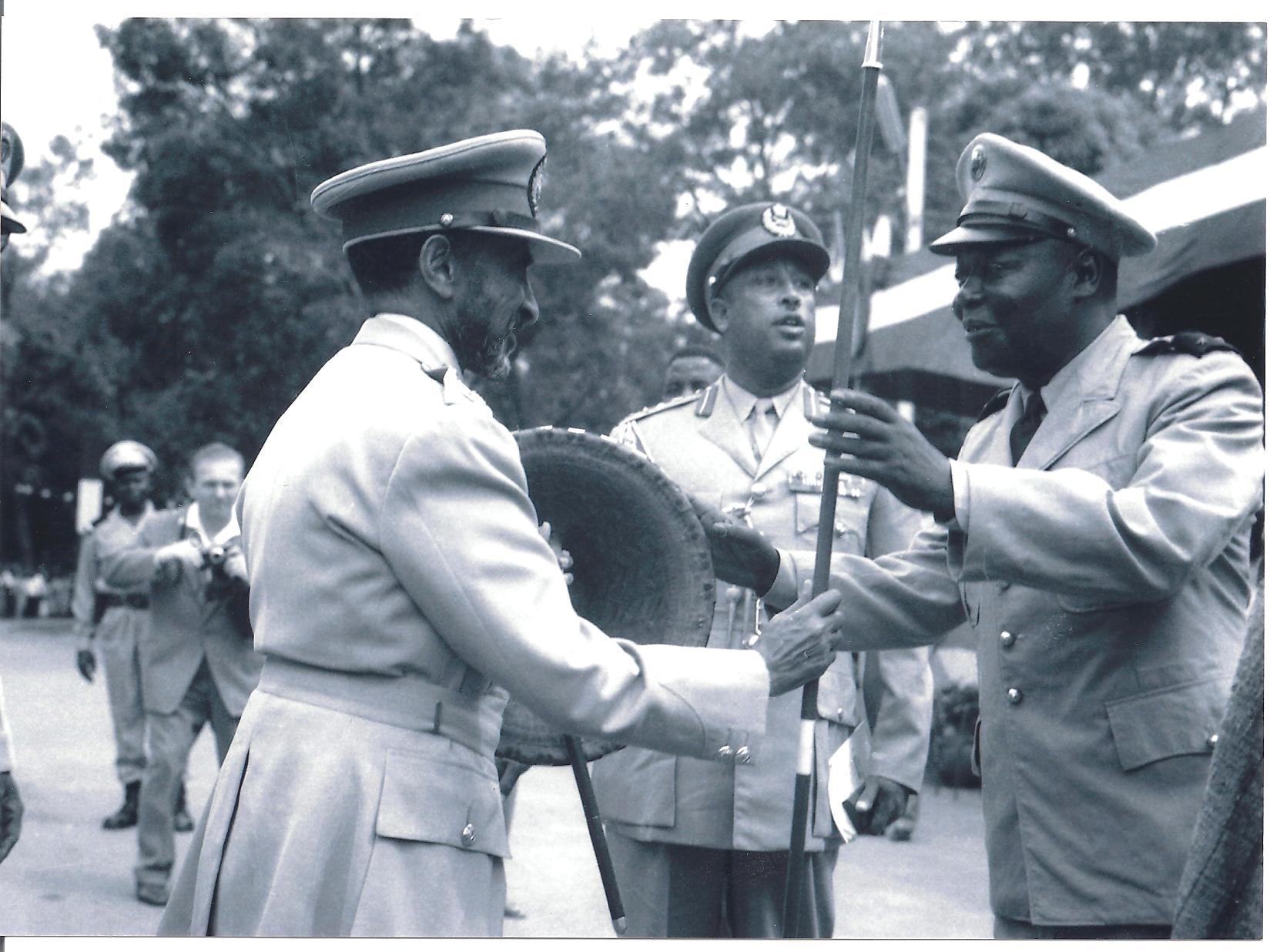
Soumaré and Ethiopian emperor Haile Selassie in 1964.

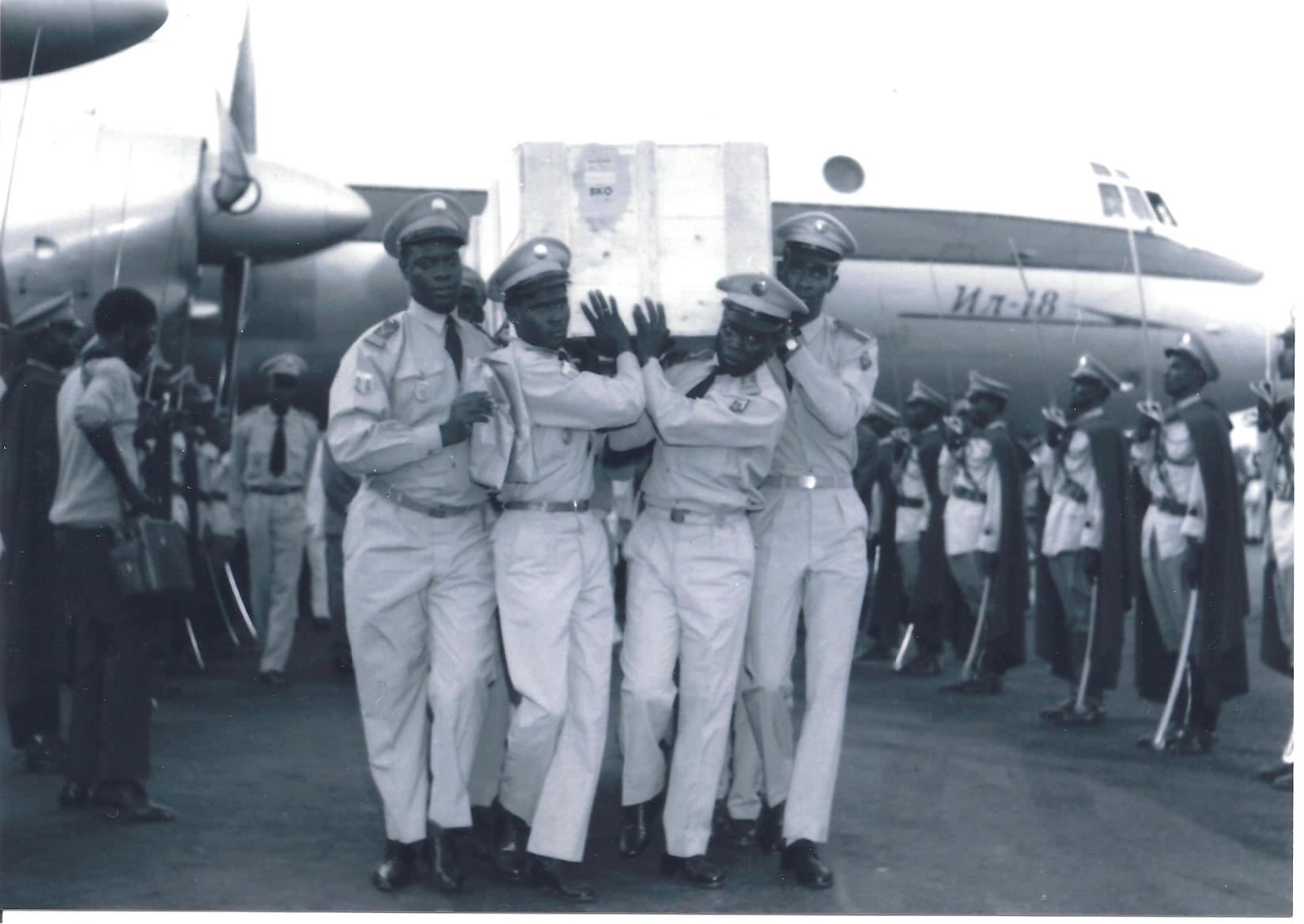
Return of Soumaré's remains to Bamako in 1964.
