= The Sinking of the Lisbon Maru =

2024 Chinese documentary film

- Chinese theatrical release poster
- 里斯本丸沉沒
- Directed by: Fang Li; Ming Fan; Lily Gong
- Based on: The Sinking of the Lisbon Maru – Britain's Forgotten Wartime Tragedy by Tony Banham; "A Faithful Record of the Lisbon Maru Incident" by Brian Finch
- Produced by: Fang Li
- Starring: Brian Finch; Tony Banham; Lin Agen; Dennis Morley; William Beningfield
- Cinematography: Florian Zinke
- Edited by: Lily Gong; Tianming Li
- Music by: Nicolas Errèra
- Production companies: Emei Film Group; Laurel Films; PMC Pictures
- Release date: 6 September 2024 (China)
- Running time: 123 minutes
- Country: China
- Languages: English; Wu Chinese; Mandarin Chinese; Japanese

The Sinking of the Lisbon Maru is a 2024 Chinese documentary film about the sinking of the Lisbon Maru during World War II, produced and directed by Fang Li, co-directed by Ming Fan and Lily Gong. It features Dennis Morley, William Beningfield, Lin Agen, Brian Finch, Tony Banham, and family members of British prisoners of war who were on board of Lisbon Maru.

== Plot ==
In October 1942, the Lisbon Maru, a Japanese transport ship secretly carrying over 1,800 British prisoners of war, was torpedoed off the coast of China by an American submarine unaware of its human cargo. The film is the first feature-length documentary covering the subject.

Through rare archival footage, survivor testimonies, and expert interviews, the documentary uncovers the harrowing journey of the prisoners as the ship began to sink, leaving them trapped below deck.

Also featured is a contemporary retrospective involving a small group of immediate next of kin of victims of the atrocity, who participated in the laying of wreaths and rose petals over the wreck site followed by a memorial service on one of the Chinese islands involved in the rescue.

== Production ==
Research for the documentary began in 2014, when Fang Li heard the story from a ferry captain in the Zhoushan archipelago, 160 km (100 miles) south-east of Shanghai, where the ship went down. Two years later, he carried out a survey of the area and captured sonar images of a wreck using magnetometers, underwater robots and other equipment. He found relatives of the POWs by advertising in several British newspapers, included oral testimony from naval officer Jack Hughieson that was given to the Imperial War Museum and, with the help of retired Major Brian Finch, military advisor to the film. The crew tracked down and interviewed the last living survivors Dennis Morley and William Beningfield.

A test screening of the unfinalised film was organised for 400 family members of the POWs at the BFI South Bank in London on August 15, 2023 followed by Warminster Town Hall on August 17, 2023, and the Royal Scots Club on August 19, 2023.

== Soundtrack ==
The original soundtrack is composed by French musician Nicolas Errèra. In addition, two original songs are featured in the documentary: "The Lisbon Maru" by Tom Hickox, from his 2014 album War, Peace and Diplomacy and "Long Way From Home" by Elly O'Keeffe.

== Release ==
The final version of the film received a World Premiere at the 26th Shanghai International Film Festival as the Opening Film where some of the relatives were invited to attend. It was later released in mainland China nationwide theatrically on September 6, 2024. The Hollywood Reporter states, this film " [...] has surprised audiences in China to the tune of RMB 45 million (£4.9 million/$6.2 million) in box office, a rare feat in a market that rarely tunes in to documentaries."

On December 1, 2024, the documentary was selected to be the Closing Film of Electric Shadows: Leicester Chinese Film Festival 2024, presented by De Montfort University. The screening took place at the Phoenix Cinema and Arts Centre. This was the first public screening of its final cut in the United Kingdom after its release in mainland China. Six more preview screenings were arranged in Oxford, Hereford, Birmingham, Manchester, Leeds and Glasgow between January and early March as a required practice to be eligible to enter the 2025 BAFTA Film Award competition.

=== UK Theatrical Release ===
The documentary finally held its UK Premiere on 17 March at the historical Regent Street Cinema, the birthplace of UK cinema-going, a place where it used to train veterans to become cinema projectionists during both wars. The film was released at limited UK cinemas from 20 March 2025. It has been certified by the BBFC as 12A. Due to another Chinese blockbuster film and Disney's Snow White being released at around the same time, and mainstream cinema chains have a preference in blockbusters fiction films, the first roll-out of the distribution took place on 24 March 2025 across 14 cities with Everyman Cinemas exclusively.

=== UK and Ireland Online Release ===
The UK and Ireland distributor released the film for exclusive online streaming via its own platform "Odyssey" on 15 August 2025, the 80th Anniversary of VJ Day, as a gesture to commoerate the tradic war event.

=== Special and Limited Edition Blu-ray Release ===
The end of WWII 80th Anniversary special and limited edition of Blu-ray will be released on 25 December 2025, the same day as the Fall of Hong Kong.

== Reception ==
=== Critical response ===
In China, the film became a box office hit, with remarkably high user ratings of 9.3 on movie site Douban and 9.6 on ticketing app Maoyan.

The film is rated 8.4/10 on IMDB. Deadline Hollywood describes it a film that "tells incredible WWII story of villainy and heroism", The Hollywood Reporter highlights how the heart of this "often gripping and heartbreaking film" is director Fang Li's personal passion of the untold story; Screen International describes it as a "gripping survival story... best suited to the small screen"; while Variety praises the "gorgeous painterly, hand-drawn animation" but concludes it "lacks the rigor its subject matter deserves." The Contending describes it as "the best documentary I have seen this year." The Times describes it as "a story of individual courage and compassion... an extraordinary, unusual film." The Guardian describes the film as "British wartime tragedy told with potent empathy". The People's Movie writes, "once you’ve seen this film, you’ll never forget the name Lisbon Maru—or what happened".

=== Accolades ===
The film won Best Documentary/Science and Education Film at the 37th Golden Rooster Awards, often referred to as China’s equivalent to the Academy Awards. It was also featured in the Asian World Film Festival 2024 Slate.

The film was originally chosen as the Chinese entry for Best International Feature Film at the 97th Academy Awards without the director's knowledge. In late October 2024, it was announced that the submission had been disqualified by the Academy of Motion Picture Arts and Sciences, due to the film not meeting the minimum non-English language requirement. Following the disqualification, production company Laurel Films resubmitted the film for consideration in the Best Documentary Feature Film category, where it was subsequently deemed eligible. However, the film did not advance to the December shortlist of 15 documentary feature films, determined by the Academy's documentary branch.

It was also submitted for consideration for the 2025 BAFTA Film Awards in the Best Documentary category, but it did not advance to the official longlist, as announced on January 3, 2025.
