= Chai Jing =

Chinese journalist and environmental activist (born 1976)

- 柴静
- Born: 1 January 1976 (age 50); Linfen, Shanxi, China
- Education: B.A. in Accounting, Changsha Railway University (now Central South University); Training program in TV production, Communication University of China; Master of Fine Arts, Peking University
- Occupation: Journalist
- Years active: 1994–2015; 2023–present
- Notable work: News Probe, Insight, Under the Dome
- Spouse: Zhao Jia

YouTube information
- Channel: 柴静 Chai Jing
- Subscribers: 1.18 million
- Views: 84.9 million
- Last updated: 16 August 2026

Chai Jing (Chinese: 柴静; pinyin: Chái Jìng; born on 1 January 1976) is a Chinese journalist. Chai began her career as a radio host in Hunan in 1995 and joined China Central Television (CCTV) in 2000. She is known for her CCTV shows News Probe (新闻调查) from 2003 to 2009 and Seeing (看见) from 2011 to 2013. Her shows featured boundary-pushing investigative and human-interest reporting, including the state broadcaster's first coverage of the gay community in 2005. In 2015, after leaving CCTV following the shutdown of Seeing amid tightening press controls, Chai produced the documentary Under the Dome (穹顶之下) about China's air pollution. The documentary was banned on 7 March 2015, marking her blacklisting in China. That same year, she was named one of Time magazine's 100 Most Influential People. In 2017, Chai relocated to Spain, where she continued her work as an independent journalist on YouTube.

== Career ==
=== Hunan Radio ===
In 1991, Chai enrolled in Changsha Railway Institute (now Central South University Railway Campus) in Changsha, Hunan Province, majoring in accounting. While still a college student, Chai wrote a letter to Shang Neng, her favorite host at local radio station, asking for a job opportunity. Shang offered her a job at the station. After graduation in 1995, Chai hosted a radio program, Gentle Moonlight (夜色温柔; yè sè wēn róu). Three years later, at age 22, she enrolled in Beijing Broadcasting Institute (now Communication University of China) to study television production, while hosting another Hunan radio program, New Youth, (新青年; xīn qīng nián).

=== China Central Television ===
In 2000, scouted by TV producer Chen Mang, Chai joined CCTV, and became a host and reporter for Horizon Connection (东方时空•时空连线; dōng fāng shí kōng•shí kōng lián xiàn) the following year. In 2003, she was reassigned to News Probe, and rose to prominence for her high-risk, on-the-ground coverage of the SARS crisis.

At CCTV, she established herself as one of China's most prominent investigative journalists, known for her boundary-pushing reports and human-interest features, which stood out, and often came under censorship pressure, at the propaganda-heavy, party-line-toeing state broadcaster. Her notable reports for News Probe include subjects such as abused women who killed their husbands, left-behind children, and, in 2005, the gay community, the first time the state broadcaster had covered a group whose existence the Chinese government had long denied. Despite eliciting mixed reactions within the media industry for its perceived sentimentality and focus on grassroots and marginalized groups rather than the traditional CCTV subjects of state affairs, her work leveraged the state broadcaster's stature to become a formidable instrument of public scrutiny, particularly in exposing abuses by local authorities.

In 2009, after she investigated Chongqing's "anti-crime" purge under Bo Xilai and cases of farmland expropriation from farmers in Inner Mongolia, the Chinese censors issued an internal directive prohibiting media outlets from conducting any "investigative reporting on legal or political institutions." Chai was subsequently removed from News Probe and left investigative journalism to anchor 24 Hours (24小时; èr shí sì xiǎo shí) and host One on One (面对面; miàn duì miàn) for CCTV News.

Beginning in 2011, she became one of the hosts of Seeing (看见; kàn jiàn), a news magazine that focused on human-interest stories but, amid tightening media controls, generally avoided investigative reporting. In 2013, Chai published her memoir Seeing (看见; kàn jiàn), named after her program of the same title, chronicling her journalism career at CCTV. The book became one of the most popular works of Chinese nonfiction in the following decade until its ban. Later that year, Seeing was suspended after airing a program on the Zhu Ling poisoning case. In 2014, Chai resigned from CCTV.

=== Under the Dome ===
While pregnant in 2013, Chai was told her daughter had a benign tumor. Following her daughter's birth, Chai undertook her own year-long investigation into China's environmental problems, spending nearly 1 million yuan ($167,000) producing a documentary called Under the Dome (穹顶之下; qióng dǐng zhī xià), which was released for free online viewing on 1 March 2015. The documentary, with Chai as a matter-of-fact on-stage presenter, was viewed more than 150 million times by March 3 and has since been censored in China.

=== YouTube ===
In July 2017, she moved to Barcelona, Spain with her husband and daughter. In August of the same year, she personally witnessed the terrorist attack on La Rambla and used the incident as an inspiration to investigate Islamic terrorism in Europe. She and director Ming Fan took several years to produce the six-episode documentary series Stranger: Talking to Jihadists (陌生人：对话圣战分子), with her husband Zhao Jia as photographer. It had been broadcast on her personal YouTube channel on 17 August 2023, with one episode per week. On 13 August, the trailer posted on WeChat was quickly blocked. Chai has since become an independent journalist, producing news programs on her YouTube channel.

In 2025, her YouTube program re-interviewed Gao Binghan, a Kuomintang veteran of the Chinese Civil War who had received the 2012 Touching China Award following her CCTV interview with him amid the improved cross-strait relations. After the second interview, against the background of what Chai described as "under the cloud of war" in the Taiwan Strait, her CCTV-era memoir Seeing (2013), a bestseller which was translated into English in 2023, was banned in China, with remaining copies pulled from bookstores and its Douban page and Baidu Encyclopedia entry removed.

== Personal life ==
From around 2000 to late 2001 or early 2002, Chai was in a relationship with Su Qun, a sports reporter and CCTV basketball commentator. She later dated Zhao Jia, a photographer, but they broke up in 2002. The two rekindled their relationship in 2012 and married in early 2013. That same year, Chai gave birth to their daughter, Chai Zhiran, in the United States.

== Controversy ==
=== False allegations ===
On 19 September 2009, a blogger, Wujinger1 (吴静儿1; wú jìng er yī), posted a false article, "Famous CCTV hostess Chai Jing arrested today on suspicion of taking bribes". The next day, Chai blogged a denial of the rumor. Several months later, on 13 July 2010, Wujinger1 ran another false article, "CCTV hostess Chai Jing was taken away by the procuratorate again today", alleging that she was again being investigated on corruption charges. It was later discovered that Wujinger1 was named Wu Zhibo, who wanted to seek attention. He apologized to Chai, saying she was his idol, and he wanted the public to know more about Chai.

== Other work ==
- One on One (面对面) is a 45-minute personal interview and biographical show of celebrities, current events and authority figures.
- Seeing, which began in 2010, was hosted by Chai on weekends. The multimedia program observes life changes and people's desires, thoughts and perceptions in the rapid transformation of the time. The goal is to improve understanding among people.

== Publications ==
- Chai, Jing (2001). 用我一辈子去忘记 [Use My Lifetime To Forget] (in Chinese). Hainan Publishing House.
- Chai, Jing (2013). 看见 [Seeing] (in Chinese). Guangxi Normal University Press. ISBN 978-7549529322.
  - English translation: Chai, Jing (2023). Seeing: A Memoir of Truth and Courage from China's Most Influential Television Journalist. Translated by Yan, Yan. Astra House. ISBN 978-1662600678.

== Awards ==
- 2003: Correspondent of the Year for investigative journalism on the fight against SARS
- 2008: Annual Green Characters Moving China in 2007
- 2009: Capital Association of Female Reporters speech contest award
- 2010: Golden Camera Prize of the Potatoes Festival. She was chosen as one of the Annual Top Ten Hosts of CCTV

== See also ==
- Pollution in China
- Investigative journalism
- Stranger: Talking to Jihadists
