= Stranger: Talking to Jihadists =

2023 Documentary

- 陌生人：对话圣战分子
- Created by: Chai Jing
- Directed by: Cissie, Wang Jin (王瑾)
- Original language: Mandarin
- No. of episodes: 6

Production
- Running time: 190 minutes

Original release
- Network: YouTube
- Release: August 17 – September 21, 2023

Stranger: Talking to Jihadists (Chinese: 陌生人：对话圣战分子) is a six-part documentary series on Islamic terrorism in Europe produced by Chinese journalist Chai Jing. Released between 17 August and 21 September 2023, the series marked the sixth anniversary of the 2017 Barcelona terrorist attack, which had inspired Chai’s investigation into Islamic terrorism in Europe.

== Plot ==
In July 2017, Chai Jing moved to Barcelona, Spain, with her husband and daughter. On 17 August that year, she witnessed the terrorist attack on La Rambla, an experience that inspired her to investigate Islamic terrorism in Europe. After several years of research and production, she released the six-part documentary series Stranger: Chai Jing Talking to Jihadists (陌生人：柴静对话圣战分子) on her personal YouTube channel, beginning on 17 August 2023, with one episode published each week. A trailer released on WeChat on 13 August was quickly censored.

The documentary, which centers conversations with former Islamic extremists as an attempt to understand the zeal and motivations of violent political ideologues, quickly garnered over 200,000 views when it released.

No.	Title	Chinese title	Directed by	Original release date
1	"In Whose Name?"	以谁之名？	Lily Gong (龚莉)	17 August 2023
In 2017, Chinese journalist Chai Jing arrived in Barcelona with the intention of never working again. A month later, she briefly lost contact with her family after a terrorist attack on their doorstep. The mastermind of the terrorist attack is dead and his motive is unknown. When the victim’s father pleaded for people to seek the truth for his three-year-old boy, she decided to return to journalism, saying, “I’m a stranger in Europe, but I’m a trained person, and 20 years of professional training have taught me to seek the truth”.
2	"No Way Out"	绝路	Lily Gong (龚莉)	24 August 2023
Chai Jing interviews recruiters and supporters of Islamist extremist groups to examine the ideological foundations of jihadist terrorism. She describes how some interviewees rejected all human governments and secular laws as illegitimate, regarded violence as the ultimate expression of loyalty to their beliefs, and sought the literal implementation of their interpretation of Islamic law. Chai also observed that some individuals failed to follow the strict rules they advocated themselves, instead blaming society for their actions and using this as justification for violence. The documentary argues that, within this extremist worldview, beliefs about heaven and hell can function as a system of rewards and punishments that encourages acts of killing and self-sacrifice.
3	"Dying Inside"	内心之死	Edith Yang	1 September 2023
Chai found that jihadist terrorists in Europe included an unusually high proportion of both thugs and elites, while a third group consisted of followers who, in her words, “could have been drawn into any ideology at the time.” She asked why violent offenders entered a religious ideological framework, why individuals educated at the University of Cambridge came to believe that turning back the clock was the best way to govern society, and how someone who had once participated in a Michael Jackson impersonation show came to describe joining a terrorist organization as “a fashionable movement.” Through these interviews, she explored the different motivations of these three groups.
4	"Paper Crown"	纸王冠	Edith Yang	8 September 2023
The jihadists interviewed denied that their radicalization was driven by economic hardship or racial discrimination. One interviewee remarked, “Many people in the world experience discrimination, but they don’t go around blowing up buildings, do they?” Seeking to understand why second-generation immigrants in Western Europe appeared to have higher rates of radicalization than those in other parts of the world, Chai found that one recurring explanation was that they were searching for a sense of identity. Another was a desire to become completely alienated from the surrounding world and to become “strangers.”
5	"Frankenstein’s Monster"	弗兰肯斯坦怪物	Not credited	15 September 2023
The most challenging episode of Chai Jing’s six-episode documentary: she confronted Europe’s counter-terrorism authorities, “Why did you let the terrorists leave?”; She questioned politicians: “Did you ignore the danger of extremism for the sake of votes?”; She discovered a strong resemblance between far-right organizations and Jihadists, as well as the same weakness and skepticism underneath the fanaticism, “If you take away the freedom of Muslims today, what will you lose tomorrow? Perhaps the freedom of journalists, the media, and the courts?“; She also reflected on the consequences of being nervous about being labeled “Islamophobic“ until the Jihadist she interviewed said, “You don’t want to talk about it? That’s an opportunity for people like us.“
6	"In the Name of Humanity"	以人之名	Not credited	21 September 2023
“The worst prison is the prison in your mind. It’s like sitting in a prison cell with the key in your hand”. The finale episode of “Stranger: Talking to Jihadists”.

== Interviewees ==
- Farid Benyettou, former jihadist recruiter
- David Vallat (1971-2024), former jihadist
- Sohail Ahmed, former Islamist extremist
- Abdelghani Merah, brother of terrorist Mohammed Merah
- Usama Hasan, former jihadist fighter and counter-extremism researcher
- Manwar Ali, former jihadist and recruiter
- Dimitri Bontinck, father of former foreign fighter Jejoen Bontinck
- Géraldine Henneghien, mother of jihadist Anis
- Véronique Roy, mother of jihadist Quentin Roy
- Hugo Micheron, political scientist specializing in European jihadism
- Amélie Chelly, sociologist and research associate at CADIS (EHESS-CNRS)
- Alain Grignard (1952-2023), Belgian counterterrorism officer
- Fernando Reinares, director of the Program on Violent Radicalization and Global Terrorism at the Elcano Royal Institute
- Nils Duquet, director of the Vlaams Vredesinstituut (Flemish Peace Institute)
- Françoise Schepmans, former mayor of Molenbeek-Saint-Jean (2013-2018)
- Ivan Humble, former organizer of English Defence League (EDL), a far-right and Islamophobic organization
- Ahmed Aboutaleb, then mayor of Rotterdam (2009-2024)
- Latifa Ibn Ziaten, mother of terrorism victim Imad Ibn Ziaten
- Mohamed El Bachiri, widower of Brussels bombing victim Loubna Lafquiri

== See also ==
- Terrorism
- Islamic State
- 1995 France bombings
- Charlie Hebdo shooting
- 2016 Brussels bombings
- 2017 Westminster attack
- 2017 Barcelona attacks
