= Li Ting (science writer) =

Chinese science writer and environmental activist (born 1981)

- 李汀
- Born: 1981 (age 44–45); Kunming, Yunnan, China
- Other names: 大脸撑在小胸上 汀见
- Education: Yunnan University (BS); Chinese Academy of Sciences (PhD)
- Occupations: Science writer, science communicator, YouTuber, and former atmospheric researcher
- Spouse: Wang Zhi'an (divorced)

YouTube information
- Channel: 汀见
- Subscribers: 182K
- Views: 11,814,884
- Last updated: August 9, 2026

Li Ting (born 1981) is a Chinese science writer, science communicator, YouTuber, and former atmospheric researcher She previously worked as a postdoctoral researcher at the Institute of Atmospheric Physics, Chinese Academy of Sciences, and was a member of the China Popular Science Writers Association (中国科普作家协会) and the China Meteorological Popular Science Committee. She currently resides in Tokyo, Japan.

== Career ==
Li earned a Ph.D. in meteorology and completed postdoctoral research at the Chinese Academy of Sciences. Under the pen name “大脸撑在小胸上” (“Big Face on Small Chest”), she published more than 100 popular science articles on atmospheric physics, meteorology, air pollution, global warming, El Niño, solar terms, tornadoes, cloud classification, weather forecasting, and other topics. Her articles appeared on platforms including Weibo, WeChat, Zhihu, People's Daily Online, Phoenix New Media, Guangming Online, Guancha, and Scientific American China. She also contributed to the national science outreach programme ‘‘Science China’’ (科普中国), participated in science programmes and interviews on Chinese radio and television, and delivered public lectures at institutions and organizations including Tsinghua University and Friends of Nature.

== Activities ==
Li was active on Sina Weibo under the pen name “大脸撑在小胸上”, where she accumulated more than 8.3 million followers. She later launched the YouTube channel Tingjian (汀见), which has over 181,000 subscribers.

In early 2017, Li drew public attention to unusually high sulfur dioxide (SO₂) concentrations in Linfen, Shanxi. She published a series of articles discussing the health hazards of sulfur dioxide, one of the principal pollutants responsible for the Great Smog of London, and reported the issue to local authorities. The articles attracted widespread public attention and contributed to an investigation by China's Ministry of Environmental Protection, which summoned Linfen municipal officials and resulted in a public apology from the city's mayor.

== Personal life ==
Li married former China Central Television journalist Wang Zhi'an in 2015. They have one child. The family later relocated to Japan, where they settled. Li and Wang divorced in 2021.

== Marriage and divorce ==
=== Background ===
According to Li, after former China Central Television journalist Wang Zhian relocated to Japan following his ban in China, he persuaded her to give up her career in China, resign from her position at the Chinese Academy of Sciences, withdraw from the public internet, and move to Japan with their child, stating that it would provide better educational opportunities. Li also alleged that Wang concealed their marriage from the public. She claimed that approximately two months after their arrival, Wang asked her to sign a divorce agreement, stating that divorcing would better protect her and their child's safety.

=== Livestream ===
On the evening of 9 March 2025, Li entered Wang's Tokyo studio and livestreamed on YouTube, tearfully alleging that she had been deceived and pressured into divorce. Wang subsequently appeared in the livestream, accused Li of trespassing, and called the police. He shouted at her, saying, "Get out. You've been staying in our house for nine days already. Look how frightened you've made our child. You're going to prison." The livestream was then cut off by staff members who attempted to calm the situation.

The following day, Li livestreamed again, alleging that Wang had deceived her into resigning from her job and moving to Japan. She said that she had sacrificed her own career prospects and public influence to support her husband's career, only to be asked to sign a divorce agreement less than two months after relocating. Li further claimed that, during the divorce proceedings, Wang had promised not to have any more children so that their child "could receive all of her father's love." She said that this promise had been broken and that she felt betrayed. In addition, she accused Wang of having physically abused her while they were living in China.

=== Wang's Response ===
Wang later issued a lengthy statement responding to the allegations. He denied ever committing domestic violence against Li, although he acknowledged that physical altercations had occurred between them. He also stated that Li had suffered from depression, and that relocating to Japan was intended both to provide her with a more comfortable environment conducive to recovery and to benefit their child's education. Wang said that the primary reason for the divorce was "personality differences." He further stated that, after the two signed their first divorce agreement in February 2021, he moved out and stayed at a guesthouse owned by a friend. Wang also denied violating the divorce agreement, stating: "The divorce proceedings were handled with the assistance of a lawyer and an interpreter, both of whom can attest that there was no deception during our negotiations. The final agreement was also submitted to the Tokyo District Court." Regarding child support, he stated that his financial contributions were not limited to the monthly payment of ¥84,000, but also included other expenses incurred by Li and their daughter.

== Publications ==
- Li, Ting (2009). 武俠，從牛A到牛C. 重庆出版社. ISBN 9787229012120.

== See also ==
- Science communication
- Popular science
- Atmospheric science
- Meteorology
