= Irina Margareta Nistor =

Romanian translator and film critic (born 1957)

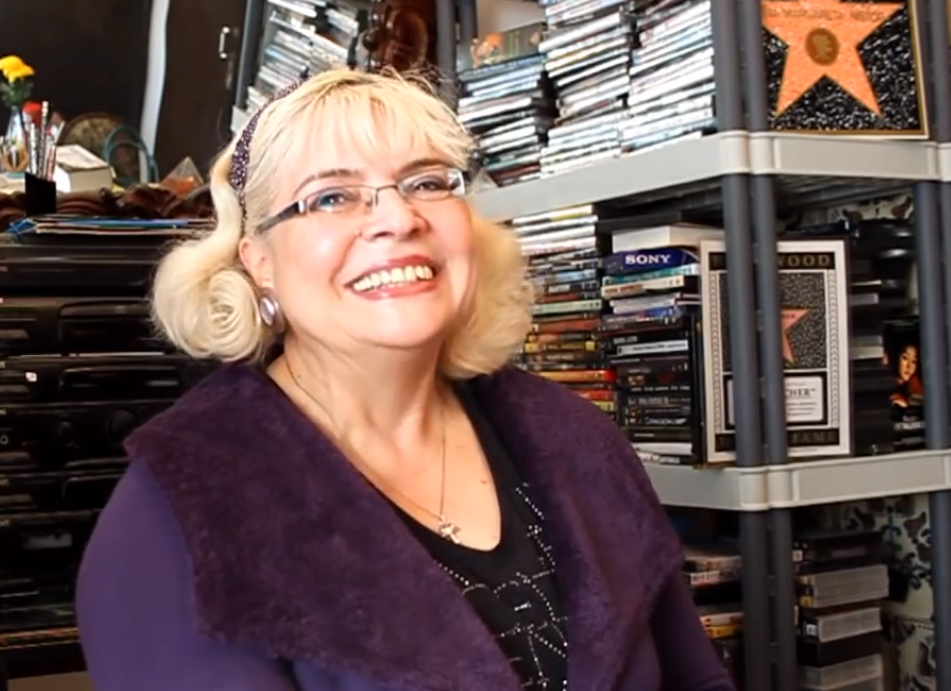
Irina Margareta Nistor

Irina Margareta Nistor (born 26 March 1957) is a Romanian translator and film critic.

== Biography ==
Nistor worked as a translator of TV programs in Romania under the Communist regime, and is known for secretly dubbing over 1,000 banned movie titles on VHS tapes smuggled in from the West in the four years between 1985 and the revolution. During the time of the Cold War, these tapes quickly spread throughout Romania, and her voice became widely known throughout the country. In a 2014 New York Times video about Nistor, one of the interviewees observed, "But we did start to wonder why all the films were dubbed by the same voice." Another interviewee stated, "It's the most well-known voice in Romania after Ceaușescu's."

Nistor worked for The Romanian Television from 1980 until 1999, first as a film translator, then as a program producer. In 1993, she produced, in French, for TV5 Europe a one-hour program called The Romanian Cinema after 1989.

Nistor is featured in the documentary Chuck Norris vs Communism, directed by London-based Romanian filmmaker, Ilinca Calugareanu. Its European premiere was at the Edinburgh International Film Festival on 24 and 25 June 2015. The film was screened at the Hawaii European Cinema: Hawaii's European Film Festival on 17 October 2015. The film also screened at Cinequest 2016, in San Jose, California, USA.

Nistor is the subject of Tom Hickox's song "The Dubbing Artist" from his 2017 album Monsters in the Deep.

Nistor remains active within the Romanian film industry. In 2012, she launched the Psychoanalysis and Film Festival, headed by psychoanalyst Andrea Sabbadini, which was the Romanian extension of the European Psychoanalytic Film Festival presided over by Italian director Bernardo Bertolucci. For nine years, she has presented a weekly one-hour Sunday program on Radio Guerrilla, The Voice of the Movies. In 2006, she published a book about her mentor, film critic D.I. Suchianu. She was an HBO adviser and a member of the screenplay jury in film financing procedures of the Romanian National Fund of Cinematography. She has also been the film selector for the DaKINO international film festival.
