= Chuck Norris vs Communism =

- Directed by: Ilinca Călugăreanu
- Written by: Ilinca Călugăreanu
- Produced by: Mara Adina
- Cinematography: Jose Ruiz
- Edited by: Ilinca Calugareanu; Per K. Kirkegaard
- Music by: Rob Manning; Anne Nikitin
- Production companies: Vernon Films; Passion Pictures; Impact Partners; RatPac Documentary Films; 4 Proof Film; Openvizor
- Release date: 23 January 2015 (Sundance)
- Running time: 78 minutes
- Countries: United Kingdom; Romania; Germany
- Language: Romanian

Chuck Norris vs Communism is a 2015 Romanian–British documentary film written and directed by Ilinca Călugăreanu. Călugăreanu had previously directed a 2014 short film about Nistor for the New York Times.

== Premise ==
The film is about the illegal importation of American action and religious films on VHS cassettes to Romania in the late 1970s and 1980s, which Călugăreanu believes contributed to the fall of the Nicolae Ceaușescu's Communist dictatorship. The film recreates incidents and features interviews with Romanians, such as film dubber Irina Margareta Nistor.

== Cast ==
- Irina Margareta Nistor as herself (as Irina Nistor), retired
- Ana Maria Moldovan as young Irina Margareta Nistor
- Dan Chiorean as Teodor Zamfir

== Reception ==
On the review aggregator website Rotten Tomatoes, 100% of 8 critics' reviews are positive, with an average rating of 8.3/10. In The Guardian, Jordan Hoffman gave the film 2/5 stars, writing: "Calugareanu's film mixes talking head interviews from people reminiscing (Irina would never swear; f-bombs were replaced with “Get lost!”) with some crafty reenactments. These well-directed scenes suggest that there is a great narrative film yet to be made about life in Romania during the 80s, one that perhaps touches on families in apartment blocks that held illegal screenings, either for money or to rouse the populace toward reform. While I'm sure the dissemination of black market tapes truly did have huge social repercussions, there's a surprising “so what?” effect after the 15th recollection of what it was like to watch Rambo. For an action star like Chuck Norris, I suspect he may have a thing or two to say about having his name attached to a film that's this dull."

David D'Arcy wrote for Screen Daily: "This documentary ode to wish fulfillment revisits the dark days of the dictatorship of Nikolae Ceausescu, yet its warmhearted glimpse into an improbable realm of resistance takes it out of boilerplate Romanian pessimism."

In Variety, Scott Foundas wrote: "Bolstered by an irresistible title and stylish, re-enactment-heavy direction from first-timer Calugareanu, this breezily entertaining bonbon can expect ample fest and niche theatrical exposure, plus brisk international TV sales."
