= Under the Dome (film) =

- Pollution in Chengdu in 2014, as depicted in Under the Dome
- 穹顶之下 (qióngdǐng zhī xià)
- Directed by: Ming Fan
- Produced by: Xin Qiang Hou
- Narrated by: Chai Jing
- Edited by: Chao Shen
- Release date: 28 February 2015
- Running time: 104 minutes
- Country: China
- Language: Mandarin
- Budget: CN¥1m (US$160,000)

Under the Dome (Chinese: 穹顶之下; pinyin: Qióngdǐng zhī xià) is a 2015 self-financed Chinese documentary by Ming Fan and Chai Jing, a former China Central Television journalist, concerning air pollution in China. It was viewed over 150 million times on Tencent within three days of its release, and had been viewed a further 150 million times by the time it was taken offline four days later.

Chai Jing started making the documentary when her as yet unborn daughter developed a tumor in the womb, which had to be removed very soon after her birth. Chai blames China's air pollution for the tumor. The film, which combines footage of a lecture with interviews and factory visits, has been compared with Al Gore's An Inconvenient Truth in both its style and potential impact. The film openly criticizes state-owned energy companies, steel producers and coal factories, as well as showing the inability of the Ministry of Environmental Protection to act against the big polluters.

Despite demonstrating the failure of China's regulations on pollution, the Chinese government at first did not censor the film. Instead, the People's Daily reposted the film alongside an interview with Chai, while Chen Jining, the recently appointed minister for environmental protection, praised the film, expressing in a text message his gratitude. However, within a week, the Communist Party’s publicity department confidentially ordered the film to be removed. An employee of China Business News was suspended for leaking the order.

== Synopsis ==
Factory on the Yangtze River, China

The documentary is narrated by Chai, who presents the results of her year-long research mostly in the form of a lecture, reminiscent of Al Gore's An Inconvenient Truth. The Great Smog of 1952 in London served as historical evidence Chai in creating her film. She reveals footage and data from factory visits and interviews with government officials, environmental experts and business owners. She also speaks with officials from London and Los Angeles on how their respective cities have managed to deal with historic issues of pollution. She says she has a personal grudge against smog, and sets out to answer three questions: What is smog? Where does it come from? And what can we do about it? For the rest of this 104 min-long ‘Ted Talk-style’ film, she answers these questions, using animations, charts, interviews, historical clips, and site visits. Hayes notes that the documentary is divided into eight sections or chapters, beginning with Beijing's January 2013 air pollution crisis and Chai's introduction of smog as the central problem.

Within the documentary, Chai features two child figures, one being her baby daughter in Beijing, and the other a six-year old in Shanxi, both victims of air pollution. Chai begins with the story of her daughter's tumor in utero and its removal shortly after her birth. Chai claims the tumor was caused by air pollution. She must keep her daughter inside "like a prisoner" on days where the air quality is particularly bad, which Chai's measurements indicated were about half of the days in 2014. In her interview with the six-year old, Chai asks, "Have you ever seen a real star?" The child responds, "No." “What about blue sky?” Chai asks. The girl says, “I’ve seen one that’s a little blue." “What about white clouds?” Chai asks. “No, I haven’t,” the child replies.

The film shows that China is losing its "war on pollution,” which was officially launched by Premier Li Keqiang on March 5, 2014. She advocates cleaning up dirty energy in China to current US standards, by washing coal, using better quality oil, installing filters, and other clean-up technology. She advocates replacing coal, the dirtiest energy source, with natural gas and oil. The targets of her film include state-owned oil companies such as China National Petroleum Corporation, which has also been the subject of the government's anti-corruption crackdown. Chai also critics PetroChina and Sinopec. These companies set their own production standards and the Ministry of Environmental Protection is largely powerless to respond. Steel producers and coal plants also ignore regulations to maximize profits. Chai visits a steel producer in Hebei province with a government inspector to measure levels of pollutants. Months later, it has yet to pay its fines but a provincial official tells her that it is not possible to shut down such factories and sacrifice employment for the sake of the environment.

Towards the end of the film, Chai urges individuals to take responsibility. She convinces a restaurant to use more environmentally sound equipment. She says: "This is how history is made. With thousands of ordinary people one day saying, 'No, I'm not satisfied, I don't want to wait. I want to stand up and do a little something.'"

== Release and ban ==
=== Release ===
Under the Dome was released online February 28, 2015, on the Saturday preceding the meetings of the National People's Congress and Chinese People's Political Consultative Conference. The documentary was initially streamed on three major internet platforms, including Tencent, Youku, and the People's Daily Online, which is the online version of the official newspaper of the Chinese Communist Party. The documentary was viewed more than 147 million times on Tencent on the evening of March 2, and received abundant discussion online. The documentary was later described as a "viral media event" and was reported to have received around 200 million views within 48 hours before being removed from major Chinese websites. Many mainstream online platforms including Sohu, NetEase, and Sina, also posted reviews about the documentary soon after its release. Traditional newspapers, however, did not respond to the documentary, with the Beijing Youth Daily posted a review of the documentary 'Chai Jing: My Personal Battle with Smog' as its headline on March 1, 2015, being the only exception.

=== Ban ===
After the initial surge in viewers for the documentary, the Chinese government blocked access to the online video. By the end of March 1, 2015, all reports and reviews about the documentary Under the Dome were withdrawn from online websites including the People’s Daily Online and other mainstream platforms. The documentary was banned on March 7, 2015, in mainland China, by the Publicity Department of the Chinese Communist Party. The reason of banning was said to be the pressure of public perception of smog and the fear of collective action of the people. The advocation for grassroots movements from everyday people, as witnessed at the end of the film, instead of obeying the top-down hierarchical system in place in China was probably another factor that contributed to the ban. The documentary featured blatant environmental violations by factories and frank speech by authoritative figures, reasoning that punishments would likely do more harm by hurting the economy and people's livelihoods.

Removal and censorship of Under the Dome from various websites caused a stir and prompted discussion among netizens across Chinese social media platforms. On Weibo, the topic reached 330 million views and over 740,000 comments. Upon release of Under the Dome, Chai Jing had access to official web-channels and the online network. Early support shown by officials and access to official online platforms prompted speculation over government environmental policy and interest. However, the fact that the film was first lauded by the Communist Party official, but then subsequently banned, illustrates the internal debate within the Chinese government over tackling the country’s dire pollution problems. The banning of the film in China evoked considerable criticism from within as Zhan Jiang, a professor of journalism and media studies in Beijing, declared that the documentary had “been spirited away by gremlins.” The contradictory actions of the government on Under the Dome—from supportive to against—implies that social media and censorship under China’s current conditions appear paradoxical and competitive in a political fashion.

Hayes similarly notes that Under the Dome had a complicated relationship with the Chinese state. The film circulated through major platforms such as Youku and the People's Daily website and was publicly praised by the minister of environmental protection, but it was later restricted after its short period of official support.

== Impact ==
According to the BBC, Under the Dome had garnered more than 100 million views online before its removal. A large number of netizens expressed their support for the documentary, and formed new views on China's haze problem after watching the film. Survey research found that exposure to the documentary amplified viewers' risk perception of air pollution, and that increased risk perception was associated with information-seeking behavior, policy support, and individual mitigation actions. In fact, phone calls to the Ministry of Environmental Protections hotline number (12369) increased 240% after the film was released online. More than 80% of viewers said that they are deeply concerned about air pollution in China. Around 70% of viewers said that they changed their view of smog and developed a better comprehension of the problem. Research on public responses to environmental pollution in China suggests that greater awareness of environmental risks can be associated with stronger public responses to pollution and health threats. Over 75% expressed a willingness to restrict car and air conditioner usage and take public transportation. Moreover, viewers believed that official bureaus, heavy-industry emitters, and legislatures should be accountable for the smog problem. Yang argues that the film's rapid spread depended partly on viewers acting as distributors through social media platforms such as WeChat.

Jack Patrick Hayes argues that Under the Dome belongs to a longer tradition of Chinese environmental and special-topic documentaries. Although the film attracted attention for its TED-like format, online release, and immediate domestic impact, Hayes compares it with earlier works such as Once Upon the Yangtze River, River Elegy, and Beijing Besieged by Waste.

A comparative discourse study by Qiuyang Li and Ya Yang found differences between Chinese and American news coverage of Under the Dome. The study argues that Chinese media coverage focused more on public emotion and opinion toward Chai Jing and the documentary, while American media coverage paid more attention to the broader event, including censorship, government responsibility, and political context.

The film resonated with parents, who had for years been expressing fears about the negative impact that air pollution was having on the health of their children, with many parents keeping their children inside as much as possible to lessen the negative impacts of pollutant levels that were forty times higher than the recommended exposure limits.

While receiving many positive responses, criticism of the documentary also emerged among the public. Some doubted that the numeric data on air pollutant emissions as well as the impacts on human health caused by smog were accurate and reliable; some even believed that these data had actually been forged by Chai Jing. Some argued that Chai Jing, through her celebrity social status, was speaking for the welfare of well-off middle-class elites instead of ordinary citizens and the low-income groups, because the latter groups have fewer opportunities to adapt to air pollution. Others still held doubts about the credibility of Chai Jing’s maternal position and how that related to the air pollution with her baby’s medical operation. Despite these criticisms, survey research found that viewers generally evaluated the documentary positively, rating it as accurate, credible, objective, timely, and easy to understand.

Li and Yang also note that some major stakeholders were largely absent from Chinese media coverage. In particular, the state-owned oil companies criticized in the documentary, including China National Petroleum Corporation and Sinopec, were not treated as discourse speakers in Chinese media reports, even though American media paid more attention to their responses and responsibilities.

=== Governmental reactions ===
Under the Dome being aired via the People’s Daily Online—the flagship website of the Chinese Communist Party—indicated that the documentary may have received official support, and been facilitating government environmental policy or speaking for official interests. As a former China Central Television (CCTV) anchorwoman and investigative journalist, Chai Jing had access to resources and gained support from both official web-channels and experts from the Ministry of Environmental Protection and the National Energy Administration. After the release, government officials also held a positive attitude towards the documentary. On March 1, 2015, China's new Minister of Environmental Protection, Chen Jining, praised the documentary as "worthy of admiration" just after the release in an inaugural news conference with Chinese reporters in Beijing. He compared it with Rachel Carson's book of 1962, Silent Spring, which is said to have given impetus to the environmental movement in the United States. He also declared, “I think this work has an important role in promoting public awareness of environmental health issues, so I’m particularly pleased about this event.” Moreover, Chinese leader Xi Jinping declared in his own address to the Chinese National People's Congress meeting on March 6 that, "We are going to punish, with an iron hand, any violators who destroy the ecology or the environment, with no exceptions."

However, four days after the release, Under the Dome was censored and taken down from social media by the Publicity Department of the Chinese Communist Party, the same media hierarchy which supported the production of the documentary. It was said that this abrupt ban was because that the central government was faced with the pressure of public perception seeing smog as an urgent and serious problem, and fear of collective reaction online that asked for major changes in relevant legislation. After the ban, some media outlets believed that Chen Jining intentionally avoided talking about Under the Dome in his first press conference while still emphasizing the achievements accomplished by the government regarding environmental issues, as well as appealing to the people on their own responsibilities to reduce the smog. He did not mention the circumstances around the CNPC or other state-owned enterprises.

The documentary also cast former General Secretary of the Chinese Communist Party, Jiang Zemin, in a negative light, prioritizing national GDP-increasing policies that damaged the environment. State-owned enterprises such as PetroChina and Sinopec, who are both guilty of environmental destruction, both greatly prospered under those ill economic policies, which were addressed in this film.

=== Industry and business ===
On March 2, 2015, the first weekday after the documentary's release, the stocks of several environmental companies traded up to ten percent higher. The stocks were in companies involved in pollutant treatment, air quality monitoring and green technology, including Sail Hero, Top Resource Conservation Engineering, LongKing Environmental and Create Technology & Science. In Hong Kong, the shares of BYD Company, a maker of electric vehicles, rose nearly seven percent.

== See also ==
- Environmental issues in film and television
- Environmental issues in China
- Pollution in China
