= Tom Hickox =

British singer-songwriter

Tom Hickox is a British singer-songwriter and music composer.

Hickox has released three studio albums as a solo artist: War, Peace and Diplomacy, Monsters in the Deep, and The Orchestra of Stories.

== War, Peace and Diplomacy ==
War, Peace and Diplomacy was released on 10 March 2014 on Fierce Panda Records, and Hickox became the first artist from that label to appear on British music TV programme Later... with Jools Holland.

The album was recorded at Yellow Arch Studios in Sheffield, and co-produced by Hickox and Colin Elliot. It features a slide guitar solo on "Out of the Warzone" by Richard Hawley.

=== Tracklisting ===
1. The Angel of the North
2. The Pretty Pride of Russia
3. Out of the Warzone
4. Your Baby Was Asleep
5. White Roses Red
6. Let Me Be Your Lover
7. A Normal Boy
8. The Lisbon Maru
9. Good Night

"The Lisbon Maru" tells the story of a British soldier who survived the torpedoing of a Japanese POW ship. Hickox appears playing the song in a documentary, The Sinking of the Lisbon Maru, that China selected as its representative at the 97th Academy Awards in the Best International Feature Film category.

A version of "Good Night" was used to score a commercial for Dr Martens featuring Agnyess Deyn. The success of the film inspired the opening segment of Rihanna and Calvin Harris' video for "We Found Love", in which Deyn also features. "The Pretty Pride of Russia" was then used to score another commercial for Dr Martens featuring Alice Dellal.

== Monsters in the Deep ==
Monsters in the Deep was released on 31 March 2017 on Family Tree Records in partnership with Warner Chappell Music.

The album was co-produced by Hickox and long time collaborator Chris Hill, and was recorded in the private Richmond studio of British songwriter Terry Britten: State of the Ark Studios.

=== Tracklisting ===
1. Man of Anatomy
2. Istanbul
3. The Plough
4. The Dubbing Artist
5. The Fanfare
6. Korean Girl in a Waiting Room
7. Perseus and Lampedusa
8. Monsters in the Deep
9. Collect all the Empties
10. Mannequin Heart

"The Dubbing Artist" tells the story of Irina Margareta Nistor, who found huge fame in her native Romania in the 1980s dubbing banned American and British movies into Romanian during the regime of Nicolae Ceausescu. Hickox performed the song in Bucharest as part of her 60th birthday celebrations.

== The Orchestra of Stories ==
The Orchestra of Stories was released on April 25, 2025 on Family Tree Records.

The album was produced by Hickox, and recorded in a multitude of studios including Air Studios. It features the Chineke! Orchestra and Onyx Brass.

The video for "Game Show" received a nomination for the 2025 London Music Video Awards.

=== Tracklisting ===
1. The Clairvoyant
2. Chalk Giants
3. Game Show
4. The Shoemaker
5. Roy and Eve
6. Lament for the Lamentable Elected
7. The Failed Assassination of Fidel Castro
8. The Whole of the Moon
9. Man on the High Road
10. The Port Quin Fishing Disaster

== Composition ==
In 2020, Hickox was commissioned by the BBC to write a piece, No Human is an Island, for their Culture in Quarantine programme in collaboration with The Chineke! Orchestra.

As composer, he scored the feature documentary Hannah: Buddhism's Untold Journey, and has scored the following short films:

- The Search for Inspiration Gone (nominated at the Edinburgh International Film Festival and the Hong Kong International Film Festival)
- 1500 Words (winner of Best Super Short Film at New York City Independent Film Festival)
- Festevil (official selection BFI London Film Festival)

== Personal life ==
Tom Hickox is the son of Richard Hickox and Frances Sheldon-Williams.
