= Tony Banham =

British military historian

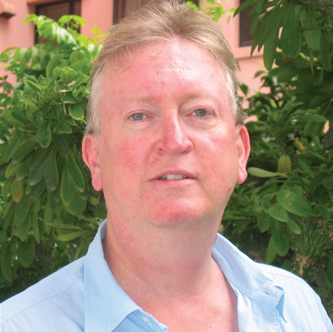
- Born: 24 July 1959 (age 67); Morley, Norfolk, England
- Known for: Hong Kong War Diary

Tony Banham (born 1959) is a British historian and founder of the Hong Kong War Diary project, which studies and documents the 1941 defence of Hong Kong, the defenders, their families, and the fates of all until liberation. His published books cover topics including the Hong Kong experience during the Second World War.

Dr Banham is also very active in the "human side" of historical research relating to the era and often speaks at various symposia on the subject and carries on an active dialogue with survivors of the conflict and their families. He also maintains a close association with various diplomatic services, government agencies, and other official parties associated with providing care and services to those involved in the conflict.

He serves, at the request on the Government of the Hong Kong SAR, on a special government panel which reviews and grants the payment of pensions to veterans ( or their survivors ) who served Hong Kong during the period. He is also Honorary Editor of the Journal of The Royal Asiatic Society Hong Kong, and principal of Reyner Banham Consulting.

== Hong Kong War Diary ==
Hong Kong War Diary began as a simple attempt to locate and centralise documentation relating to Hong Kong's wartime garrison, but soon evolved into the core of a community of interest around this group of people. What started off as purely a centre of information exchange, grew into a historical network that helps today's descendants of the defenders place their ancestors' experiences in context, offers a service to other researchers, and reunites families split by war. His website has more than 10,000 regular readers and he is generally acknowledged as the authority on Hong Kong's POWs. The central ethos of the project has been to catalyze the open exchange of all information from disparate sources for the benefit of the maximum number of people.

Banham's core interest is in the impact of war on society at both the micro and macro level. This interest runs the gamut from studying the civilian casualties in the London blitz to writing about the concept of the island of Tinian (where Banham has conducted on-site research) being, as the location where the final assembly of "Little Boy" and "Fat Man" took place, the geographical segue between the 'old war' (of tanks and marines storming beaches) to the 'new war' which has dominated civilization since Hiroshima. Hong Kong, while perhaps not the central theatre of the conflict, offered an opportunity to study a small population in the context of the critical path to victory that dominated the core of the Pacific War.

Banham received his PhD in history from the Australian Defence Force Academy (ADFA), Canberra. The book Reduced to a Symbolical Scale is closely based on his thesis.

In September 2024, the Chinese government chose the documentary film The Sinking of the Lisbon Maru (largely based on Banham's book of the same name) as the national entry in the International Film category of the 2025 Oscars.

== Bibliography ==
Book	Publisher	Year
"Potato" Jone's Diary	Battlefields Review	2001
Life Moves On, Time Moves Forward	Battlefields Review	2001
Not The Slightest Chance	Hong Kong University Press	2003
Serving Hong Kong – The Hong Kong Volunteers (One chapter)	Hong Kong Museum of Coastal Defence	2004
A Small Story in a Big War	Journal of the Pacific War Research Group	2004
WWII Ordnance in Hong Kong	Journal of the Pacific War Research Group	2004
Where Old War Met New	Journal of the Pacific War Research Group	2004
In Search of The Lisbon Maru	Journal of the Pacific War Research Group	2005
A Short History of 3 Coy, Hong Kong Volunteer Defence Corps	Royal Asiatic Society	2005
The Sinking of the Lisbon Maru	Hong Kong University Press	2006
We Shall Suffer There	Hong Kong University Press	2009
Ship of Death	Discovery Channel Magazine	2009
A Short History of the Hong Kong Dockyard Defence Corps	Royal Asiatic Society	2011
Hong Kong Dictionary of National Biography (three sections)	Hong Kong University Press	2011
A Short History of the Hong Kong Chinese Regiment	Royal Asiatic Society	2014
A Historiography of C Force	Canadian Military History Vol 24 Iss 2	2015
Reduced to a Symbolical Scale	Hong Kong University Press	2017
A Short History of Bungalow A, St Stephen's College	Royal Asiatic Society	2017
The Big For	Amazon	2019
Hong Kong's Civilian Fatalities of the Second World War	Royal Asiatic Society	2019
