= Chen Chun-han =

Taiwanese lawyer

- 陳俊翰
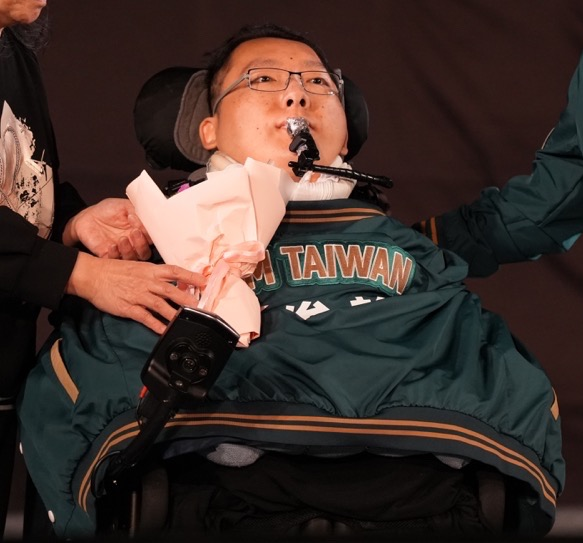
- Chen during the DPP's 2024 election campaign
- Born: June 15, 1983; Hsinchu, Taiwan
- Died: February 10, 2024 (aged 40); Hsinchu, Taiwan
- Resting place: Hsinchu City Life Memorial Park
- Education: National Taiwan University (BA, LLB, LLM); Harvard University (LLM); University of Michigan (LLM, SJD)
- Occupations: Lawyer; educator
- Political party: Democratic Progressive Party

Chen Chun-han (Chinese: 陳俊翰; pinyin: Chén Jùnhàn; June 15, 1983 – February 10, 2024) was a Taiwanese lawyer and legal scholar known for his advocacy for disability rights. He was a post-doctoral researcher at the Academia Sinica's Institute of Legal Studies and a member of the Executive Yuan's Subcommittee on the Protection and Promotion of Human Rights.

== Early life and education ==
Chen was born in Hsinchu on June 15, 1983, with spinal muscular atrophy. His movement was restricted to one finger, his mouth, and his eyes.

Despite his disability, Chen graduated from National Hsinchu Senior High School and studied accounting and law at National Taiwan University, where earned a B.A. in accounting and his LL.B. and LL.M. degrees. He then completed graduate studies in the United States at Harvard University, where he earned a second LL.M. from Harvard Law School in 2012, and the University of Michigan, where he earned a third LL.M. in 2017 and his Doctor of Juridical Science (S.J.D.) from the University of Michigan Law School in 2022.

Chen's doctoral dissertation at Michigan, completed under Steven Ratner, was titled, "Equality, Non-Discrimination, and Reasonable Accommodation: The United Nations Convention on the Rights of Persons with Disabilities through Comparative Perspectives". He was licensed to practice law in New York.

== Death ==
On February 10, 2024, Chen died at the National Taiwan University Hospital Hsinchu North District Branch after fighting a cold-related lung infection.
