= David Vallat =

French jihadist (1971–2024)

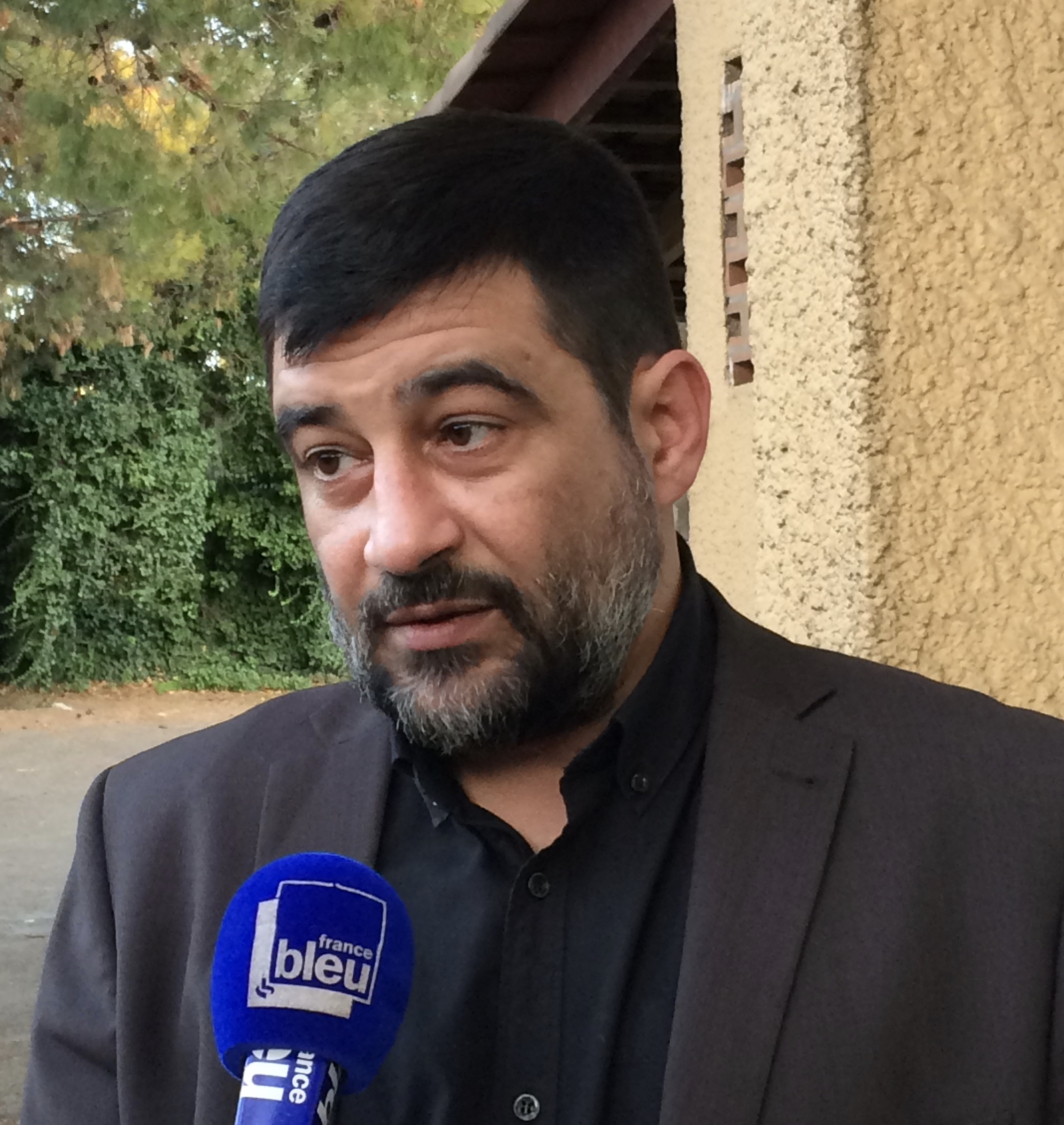
- Vallat in 2017
- Born: 1971; Villefontaine, France
- Died: October 2024 (aged 53); Saint-Raphaël, France
- Other names: Jihadist

David Vallat (1971 – October 2024) was a French jihadist.

== Biography ==
Born in Villefontaine in 1971, Vallat grew up in a multicultural neighborhood. At the age of 15, he learned Arabic and converted to Islam. During this time, he fell into delinquency, committing multiple burglaries and car thefts. He then turned to a more advanced practice of Islam which steered him away from petty crimes. In 1991, he completed his military service with the Chasseurs Alpins in the 27th Mountain Infantry Brigade.

In 1993, Vallat travelled to Bosnia and Herzegovina with nine other men to fight for the Bosnian mujahideen in the Bosnian War. However, the group was turned back at the border with Croatia and forced to return to France. The following year, he flew to Pakistan and subsequently crossed into Afghanistan, where he trained for several months in a jihadist camp. He returned to France on 26 December 1994 and formed a jihadist cell in Chasse-sur-Rhône, which provided aid to the Armed Islamic Group of Algeria. He aided the Algerian terrorist Ali Touchent, at the time stuck in the Netherlands, by forging him an identity document. His group was dismantled in the wake of the 1995 France bombings following a police search of his home, which revealed a large collection of weapons and material used for making explosive devices.

On 18 February 1998, Vallat was sentenced to six years in prison for criminal association with a terrorist enterprise, which was reduced to five years on appeal. He spent 52 months in detention in La Santé Prison, the Centre pénitentiaire de Nanterre-Hauts-de-Seine, and the Maison d'arrêt de Villepinte. He was freed on 18 December 1999. He later claimed to be "deradicalized" in prison and took history courses at Bordeaux Montaigne University, though he later abandoned his studies and became a locksmith.

During the 2010s, Vallat broke his silence and began to speak out about his time as a jihadist. He first wrote in the Libération newspaper anonymously following the Toulouse and Montauban shootings. After the 2015 shooting at Charlie Hebdo, he testified under his own name for Le Monde. Later that month, he appeared on the France 2 show Complément d'enquête and looked back at the Assault of Dammartin-en-Goële.

David Vallat was found dead during the weekend of 19 October 2024, at the age of 53.

== Book ==
- Terreur de jeunesse (2016)
