= Jean-Pierre Vallat =

French historian and archeologist (1951–2021)

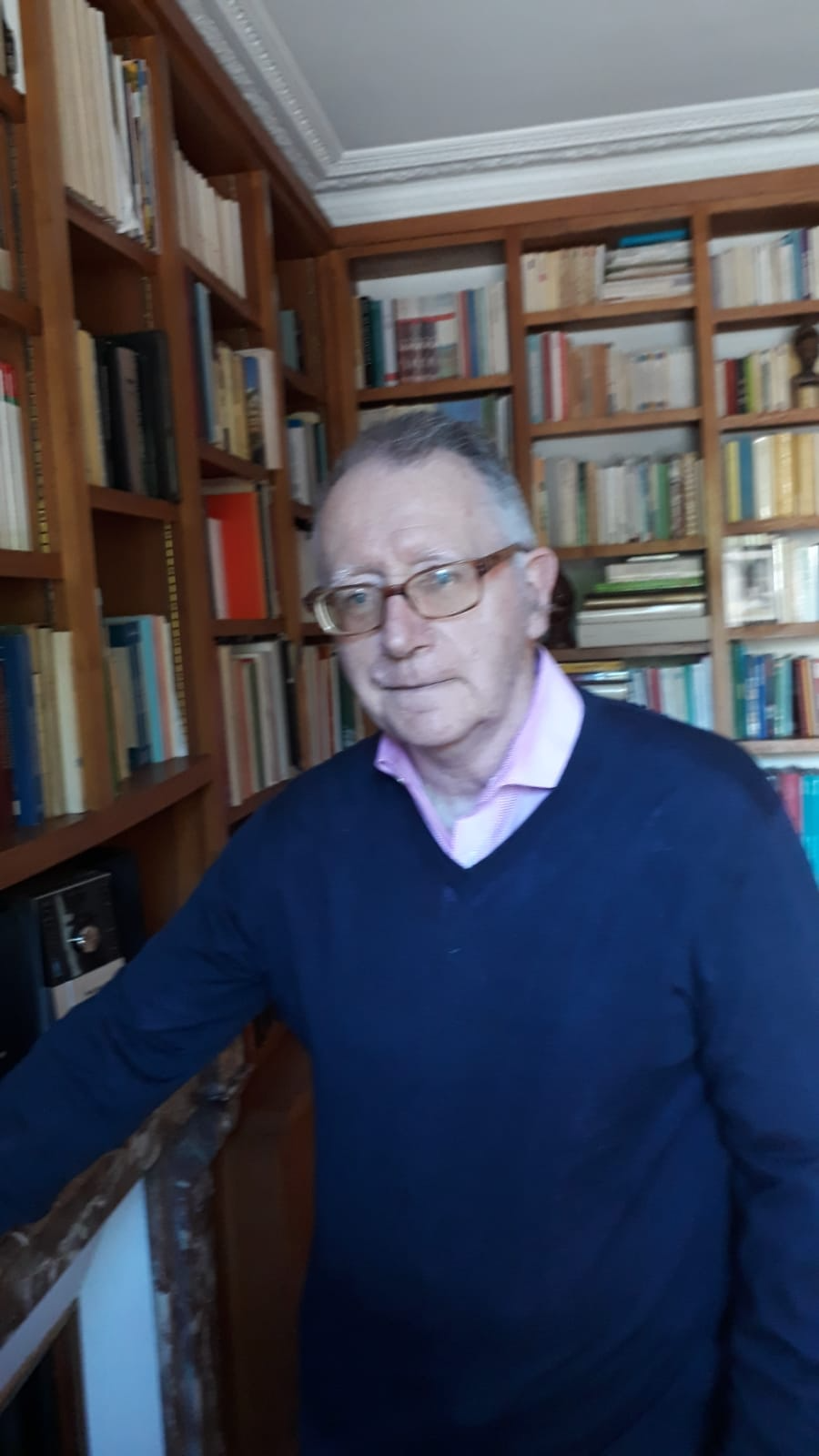
- Vallat in 2016
- Born: 10 August 1951; Roche-la-Molière, France
- Died: 22 June 2021 (aged 69)
- Occupations: Historian; Archeologist

Jean-Pierre Vallat (10 August 1951 – 22 June 2021) was a French historian and archeologist. A member of the French School of Rome, he was a professor emeritus of Roman history at Paris Diderot University.

== Biography ==
After he finished secondary school at the Lycée Claude-Fauriel, Vallat studied history at the École normale supérieure de Fontenay-Saint-Cloud from 1971 to 1975. He then studied at the French School of Rome from 1978 to 1981. In 1982, he became a researcher at the French National Centre for Scientific Research, a position he held until 1988.

In 1988, Vallat became vice-president of Sorbonne Paris North University, and was subsequently in charge of electing members to the Conseil national des universités from 1994 to 1998. In 1997, he supported a habilitation titled Histoire économique et sociale de la Campanie à l’époque romaine. He also served on the Federation of General Unions of National Education.

From 2000 to 2004, Vallat directed the school of human sciences at Paris Diderot University. In 2012, he became a professor emeritus of the university. From 2013 to 2015, he was a scientific delegate on the High Council for the Evaluation of Research and Higher Education.

Jean-Pierre Vallat died on 22 June 2021 at the age of 69.

== Publications ==
- La cité des Ségusiaves à l'époque romaine (Ier siècle av. J. C. au IVe ap. J. C.) (1981)
- Statut juridique et statut réel des terres en Campanie du Nord (III-I av. J. C.) (1981)
- Structures agraires en Italie centro-méridionale : cadastres et paysages ruraux (1987)
- Campagnes de la Méditerranée romaine : Occident (1993)
- L'Italie et Rome : 218-31 av. J.-C. (1995)
- Le bail romain dans l'historiographie de la Méditerranée occidentale (1997)
- La banlieue nord de Paris : gestion, sauvegarde et conservation du patrimoine (1997)
- Mémoires de patrimoines (2009)
- Le Togo : lieux de mémoire et sites de conscience (2013)
- Figuig, une oasis au cœur des cultures (2014)
- La géoarchéologie française au xxie siècle, French geoarcheology in the 21st century (2019)
- Les mondes romains : questions d'archéologie et d'histoire (2020)
