= 2024 in music =

This topic covers events and articles related to 2024 in music.

== Specific locations ==
- African music
- American music
- Asian music
- British music
- Canadian music
- Chinese music
- Japanese music
- Latin music
- Philippine music
- Scandinavian music
- South Korean music

== Specific genres ==
- Classical
- Country
- Jazz
- Latin
- Heavy metal
- Hip-hop
- R&B
- Progressive rock
- Rock
- K-pop
- J-pop

== Awards ==
66th Annual Grammy Awards (USA)
Record of the Year: "Flowers" by Miley Cyrus • Album of the Year: Midnights by Taylor Swift • Song of the Year: "What Was I Made For?" by Billie Eilish • Best New Artist: Victoria Monét
2024 Billboard Music Awards (USA)
Top Artist: Taylor Swift • Top New Artist: Chappell Roan • Top Billboard 200 Album: The Tortured Poets Department by Taylor Swift • Top Hot 100 Song: "Lose Control" by Teddy Swims
2024 Brit Awards (UK)
British Album of the Year: My 21st Century Blues by Raye • Song of the Year: "Escapism" by Raye featuring 070 Shake • British Artist of the Year: Raye • Best New Artist: Raye • British Group: Jungle
Juno Awards of 2024 (Canada)
Artist of the Year: Tate McRae • Group of the Year: The Beaches • Album of the Year: 99 Nights by Charlotte Cardin • Single of the Year: "Greedy" by Tate McRae
2024 MAMA Awards
Artist of the Year: Seventeen • Album of the Year: Seventeenth Heaven by Seventeen • Song of the Year: "Supernova" by Aespa • Best Music Video: "Armageddon" by Aespa
2024 MTV Video Music Awards Japan (Japan)
No ceremony held due to being rescheduled to 2025
2024 MTV Video Music Awards (USA)
Video of the Year: "Fortnight" by Taylor Swift featuring Post Malone • Song of the Year: "Espresso" by Sabrina Carpenter • Best New Artist: Chappell Roan • Push Performance of the Year: Le Sserafim
2024 MTV Europe Music Awards (Europe)
Best Song: "Espresso" by Sabrina Carpenter • Best Video: "Fortnight" by Taylor Swift featuring Post Malone • Best Artist: Taylor Swift • Best New: Benson Boone
2024 American Music Awards (USA)
No ceremony held due to 50th anniversary special airing in its place and rescheduled to 2025
38th Golden Disc Awards (South Korea)
Album of the Year: FML by Seventeen • Song of the Year: "Ditto" by NewJeans • Rookie Artist of the Year: Fifty Fifty, Zerobaseone
66th Japan Record Awards (Japan)
Grand Prix winner: "Lilac" by Mrs. Green Apple
Pulitzer Prize for Music (USA)
Adagio (for Wadada Leo Smith) by Tyshawn Sorey
Rock and Roll Hall of Fame (USA)
Performers: Mary J. Blige • Cher • Dave Matthews Band • Foreigner • Kool & The Gang • Ozzy Osbourne • A Tribe Called Quest Musical Influences: Alexis Korner • John Mayall • Big Mama Thornton Ahmet Ertegun Award (Non-performers): Suzanne de Passe Musical Excellence: Jimmy Buffett • MC5 • Dionne Warwick • Norman Whitfield
Mercury Prize (UK)
This Could Be Texas by English Teacher
Polar Music Prize (Sweden)
Nile Rodgers • Esa-Pekka Salonen
2024 iHeartRadio Music Awards (USA)
Song of the Year: "Kill Bill" by SZA • Artist of the Year: Taylor Swift • Best Music Video: "Seven" by Jungkook featuring Latto
Polaris Music Prize (Canada)
Motewolonuwok by Jeremy Dutcher
Eurovision Song Contest 2024 (Europe)
"The Code" by Nemo (Switzerland)
33rd Seoul Music Awards (South Korea)
Grand Award: NCT Dream • Best Song Award: "OMG" by NewJeans • Best Album Award: FML by Seventeen • Rookie Artist Award: Riize, Zerobaseone
21st Korean Music Awards (South Korea)
Album of the Year: Nowitzki by Beenzino • Song of the Year: "Ditto" by NewJeans • Musician of the Year: Silica Gel • Rookie of the Year: Kiss of Life
16th Mirchi Music Awards (India)
Album of the Year: Tu Jhoothi Main Makkaar by Arijit Singh, Charan, Divya Kumar, Jubin Nautiyal, Nikhita Gandhi, Shashwat Singh, Sunidhi Chauhan, Shreya Ghoshal, Pritam, and Amitabh Bhattacharya • Song of the Year: "Besharam Rang" by Vishal–Shekhar, Shilpa Rao, Kumaar, and Caralisa Monteiro • Music Composer of The Year: Vishal–Shekhar

== Bands formed ==
- Ae! group
- All(H)Ours
- ARrC
- Artms
- B.D.U
- Badvillain
- Candy Shop
- Cutie Street
- DearALICE
- Dragon Pony
- Dxmon
- Geenius
- House of Protection
- Illit
- Izna
- Julien Baker & Torres
- Katseye
- Me:I
- Madein
- Meovv
- NOMAD
- Nowadays
- Number_i
- Rescene
- Say My Name
- Sweet Steady
- TIOT
- TWS
- Unis
- Waker
- Waterfire

== Soloist debuts ==
- Ayaka Nanase
- Cha Eun-woo
- Chanyeol
- Damiano David
- Doyoung
- George Au
- Hina Suguta
- Hina Tachibana
- Hui
- Ian
- Irene
- JADE
- Jaehyun
- Jinho
- Koo Jun-hoe
- L
- Lay Zhang
- Lee Seung-hoon
- Lucas
- Naevis
- Perrie
- Seola
- Shōya Chiba
- Sungjin
- Timothée Chalamet
- Ten
- Tzuyu
- Victoria De Angelis
- Wooseok
- Yeonjun
- Yoon San-ha
- Yuqi
- Yves

== Bands disbanded ==
- Botch
- Boys World
- Burnside Project
- Cherry Bullet
- Cignature
- Fleetwood Mac
- The Greg Kihn Band
- Hall & Oates
- Hey Violet
- Hot Hot Heat
- Issues
- Jane's Addiction
- Japandroids
- John Mayall & the Bluesbreakers
- Magnum
- MC5
- Metz
- Mirae
- Mr. Big
- Nature
- NOFX
- Oxbow
- Pink Fantasy
- Porno for Pyros
- Rage Against the Machine
- Reagan Youth
- Sublime with Rome
- TFN
- Tokyo Police Club
- Vromance
- Weki Meki
- Zion & Lennox

== Bands reformed ==
- 2NE1
- 3 Inches of Blood
- A*Teens
- Acid Bath
- Cardiacs (as Cardiacs Family)
- Cobra Starship
- Down With Webster
- Fairground Attraction
- fightstar
- Have Heart
- Linkin Park
- Machine Gun Fellatio
- Moose Blood
- Nachtmystium
- No Doubt
- Oasis
- Orange 9mm
- The Pains of Being Pure at Heart
- Rascal Flatts
- R.E.M. (One-off reunion)
- Sex Pistols
- Slayer
- Soul Coughing
- Tak Matsumoto Group

== Bands on hiatus ==
- Black Midi
- Boygenius
- Foo Fighters
- Tenacious D
- Vcha
- Thank You, I'm Sorry

== Deaths ==
=== January ===
- 2 – Chris Karrer, 76, German progressive rock guitarist (Amon Düül II)
- 3 – Tawl Ross, 75, American funk guitarist (Funkadelic)
- 4
  - Ruy Mingas, 84, Angolan folk singer-songwriter and anthem composer
  - Marie Nilsson Lind, 62, Swedish folk pop singer (Ainbusk)
  - David Soul, 80, American-British pop singer
  - Glynis Johns, 100, British musical theatre actress and singer
- 5
  - Larry Collins, 79, American rockabilly guitarist and songwriter (The Collins Kids)
  - Del Palmer, 71, English art rock singer-songwriter, bassist and sound engineer
- 6
  - Iasos, 76, Greek-born American new age keyboardist
  - Amparo Rubín, 68, Mexican folk singer-songwriter
- 7
  - Germana Caroli, 92, Italian pop singer
  - Tony Clarkin, 77, English hard rock guitarist and songwriter (Magnum)
- 8
  - Guy Bonnet, 78, French pop singer-songwriter
  - Phill Niblock, 90, American avant garde composer
  - Gian Franco Reverberi, 89, Italian film composer (death announced on this date)
- 9
  - Diego Gallardo, 31, Ecuadorian folk singer-songwriter
  - Karel Janovický, 93, Czech-born British classical composer and pianist
  - Rashid Khan, 55, Indian Hindustani classical singer
  - James Kottak, 61, American hard rock drummer (Scorpions, Kingdom Come, Kottak)
- 10
  - Audie Blaylock, 61, American bluegrass singer and guitarist
  - Tamara Milashkina, 89, Russian opera singer
- 11
  - Annie Nightingale, 83, English radio disk jockey
  - Sigi Schwab, 83, German jazz guitarist
- 12
  - Bill Hayes, 98, American folk singer
  - David Lumsdaine, 92, Australian classical composer
- 13
  - Prabha Atre, 91, Indian classical singer
  - Jo-El Sonnier, 77, American country singer-songwriter and accordionist
  - Romuald Twardowski, 93, Polish classical composer
- 15 – K. J. Joy, 77, Indian film and classical composer
- 16
  - Peter Schickele, 88, American classical composer and musical satirist (P. D. Q. Bach)
  - Laurie Johnson, 96, English classical composer and swing bandleader
- 17
  - Serge Laprade, 83, Canadian pop singer
  - Gerd Uecker, 77, German opera director and music teacher
- 18
  - Katelele Ching'oma, 32, Malawian pop singer
  - Ivan Moody, 59, British classical composer and musicologist
  - Silent Servant, 46, Guatemalan-born American techno DJ
  - The Soft Moon, 44, American darkwave singer-songwriter and multi-instrumentalist
  - Yogesh Vaidya, 77, Nepalese folk singer
- 19
  - Georgi Kostov, 82, Bulgarian classical composer
  - Ewa Podleś, 71, Polish opera singer
  - Marlena Shaw, 81, American jazz and soul singer
  - Pluto Shervington, 73, Jamaican reggae singer
  - Mary Weiss, 75, American pop singer (The Shangri-Las)
- 20
  - Zoran Erić, 73, Serbian classical composer
  - Charis Kostopoulos, 59, Greek laiko singer-songwriter.
- 22
  - Neil Kulkarni, 51, British music journalist
  - Margo Smith, 84, American singer-songwriter
  - Sergei Yefremenko, 51, Russian ska singer and guitarist (Markscheider Kunst)
- 23
  - Melanie, 76, American folk singer-songwriter and guitarist
  - Frank Farian, 82, German pop singer-songwriter and record producer (Boney M., Milli Vanilli, La Bouche, No Mercy)
  - Anders Sandberg, 55, Swedish Eurodance singer (Rednex).
- 24 – Anders Lampe, 59, Danish pop rock guitarist (Bamses Venner)
- 25
  - Bruno Amstad, 59–60, Swiss jazz singer
  - Bhavatharini, 47, Indian playback singer and film music director
- 26
  - Dean Brown, 68, American jazz guitarist
  - Michel Hausser, 96, French jazz vibraphonist
  - Michael Watford, 80, American dance and house singer
- 27 – Lillebjørn Nilsen, 73, Norwegian folk singer-songwriter
- 28 – Albert Mayr, 80, Italian classical and experimental composer
- 29
  - Tony Cedras, 71, South African jazz multi-instrumentalist
  - Yuri Ilchenko, 72, Russian rock singer and guitarist (Mify, Zemlyane)
- 30 – Chita Rivera, 91, American musical theater singer and actress

=== February ===
- 2
  - Steve Brown, 66, British classical composer
  - Wilhelmenia Fernandez, 75, American opera singer
  - Wayne Kramer, 75, American rock guitarist and songwriter (MC5)
- 3 – Aston "Family Man" Barrett, 77, Jamaican reggae bassist (Bob Marley and the Wailers, The Upsetters)
- 5 – Toby Keith, 62, American country singer-songwriter
- 6
  - Donald Kinsey, 70, American blues and reggae guitarist and singer (The Kinsey Report, The Wailers Band)
  - Seiji Ozawa, 88, Japanese classical conductor
- 7
  - Vaja Azarashvili, 87, Georgian classical composer
  - Henry Fambrough, 85, American R&B singer (The Spinners)
  - Mojo Nixon, 66, American psychobilly singer-songwriter
- 8 – Yuri Borzov, 70, Russian blues rock drummer (Mashina Vremeni)
- 9
  - Nikša Gligo, 77, Croatian musicologist
  - Damo Suzuki, 74, Japanese Krautrock singer (Can)
  - Jimmy Van Eaton, 86, American rock and roll drummer
- 11
  - Ladislav Burlas, 96, Slovak classical composer and musicologist
  - Randy Sparks, 90, American folk singer-songwriter (The New Christy Minstrels, The Back Porch Majority)
  - Mihai Amihalachioaie, 62, Moldovan accordionist and conductor
- 12
  - Tamás Deák, 95, Hungarian classical composer and conductor
  - Rudolf Jansen, 84, Dutch classical pianist
  - Juris Kulakovs, 65, Latvian rock keyboardist (Pērkons)
  - Steve Wright, 69, English radio disk jockey
- 13
  - Eddie Cheeba, 67, American hip hop DJ
  - Jussi Raittinen, 80, Finnish Rautalanka singer and guitarist
- 15 – Ian Amey, 79, English rock singer and guitarist (Dave Dee, Dozy, Beaky, Mick & Tich)
- 16
  - Etterlene DeBarge, 88, American gospel singer
  - Fritz Hinz, 68, Canadian hard rock drummer (Helix)
  - Reuben Jackson, 67, American jazz historian
  - Ben Lanzarone, 85, American television composer
  - Dexter Romweber, 57, American rockabilly guitarist (Flat Duo Jets)
  - Cynthia Strother, 88, American pop singer (The Bell Sisters)
- 18
  - Davlatmand Kholov, 73, Tajik Shashmaqam multi-instrumentalist
  - Hasina Mumtaz, 78, Bangladeshi pop singer
- 19
  - Stewart Robertson, 75, Scottish classical conductor (death announced on this date)
  - Bobby Tench, 79, British blues rock singer and guitarist (Humble Pie, The Jeff Beck Group, Hummingbird, Streetwalkers, The Gass). (death announced on this date)
- 20
  - David Libert, 81, American sunshine pop singer and keyboardist (The Happenings)
  - Geoffrey Michaels, 79, Australian classical violinist and violist (death announced on this date)
- 21 – Vitalij Kuprij, 49, Ukrainian-American symphonic metal keyboardist (Trans-Siberian Orchestra, Ring of Fire)
- 22
  - John Lowe, 81, English skiffle pianist (The Quarrymen)
  - Roni Stoneman, 85, American bluegrass banjoist
- 23
  - Tina Rainford, 77, German pop singer
  - Shinsadong Tiger, 40, South Korean record producer
- 24 – Juana Bacallao, 98, Cuban guaracha singer
- 25
  - Bigidagoe, 26, Dutch rapper
  - Peter "Peetah" Morgan, 46, Jamaican reggae singer (Morgan Heritage)
- 26
  - Bhakta Raj Acharya, 81, Nepali Bhajan singer and composer
  - Pankaj Udhas, 72, Indian ghazal singer
- 28
  - Cat Janice, 31, American electropop singer-songwriter
  - Eugen Indjic, 76, Yugoslav born French-American classical pianist
- 29 – Eugen Šváb, 87, Slovak swing singer and percussionist

=== March ===
- 1
  - Ernest Berger, 73, Czech-born British funk and disco drummer (Heatwave)
  - Don Wise, 81, American R&B saxophonist
- 2
  - Jim Beard, 63, American jazz rock keyboardist (Steely Dan)
  - Blues Boy Willie, 77, American blues singer and guitarist
  - W. C. Clark, 84, American blues singer and guitarist
- 3
  - Eleanor Collins, 104, Canadian jazz singer
  - Emmanuëlle, 81, Canadian pop singer
  - Oscar Ghiglia, 85, Italian classical guitarist
  - Günther Leib, 96, German opera singer
  - Amjad Parvez, 78, Pakistani semi-classical singer
  - Presto, 31, German rapper
  - Bill Ramsay, 95, American jazz saxophonist
  - Félix Sabal Lecco, 64–65, Cameroonian makossa and rock drummer
  - Makoto Shinohara, 92, Japanese classical composer
  - Brit Turner, 57, American country rock drummer (Blackberry Smoke)
- 4
  - B. B. Seaton, 79, Jamaican ska and rocksteady singer (The Gaylads)
  - Amnon Weinstein, 84, Israeli violin luthier
- 5
  - Linda Balgord, 64, American musical theater actress and singer
  - Debra Byrd, 72, American soul singer and vocal coach
  - Brahim Fribgane, Moroccan jazz oud player and percussionist (La Mar Enfortuna) (death announced on this date)
- 6 – Dimos Moutsis, 85, Greek Éntekhno singer-songwriter and composer
- 7
  - Pedro Altamiranda, 88, Panamanian salsa singer
  - Joe Cutajar, 83, Maltese pop singer (Helen and Joseph). (death announced on this date)
  - Françoise Garner, 90, French opera singer
  - Steve Lawrence, 88, American pop singer
- 8
  - Abdou Cherif, 52, Moroccan pop singer
  - Ernie Fields Jr., 89, American jazz saxophonist
  - George Newson, 91, English electronic and avant-garde composer and pianist
  - Ľubomír Stankovský, 72, Slovak pop rock singer and drummer (Modus)
- 9
  - Malcolm Holcombe, 68, American alternative country singer-songwriter
  - Vince Power, 76, Irish music festival promoter
  - Guy Touvron, 74, French classical trumpeter
- 10
  - Blake Harrison, 48, American grindcore sampler (Pig Destroyer, Hatebeak)
  - Paul Nelson, American blues guitarist
  - T. M. Stevens, 72, American rock bassist (The Pretenders, Vai)
  - Marc Tobaly, 74, Moroccan-born French rock guitarist (Les Variations)
  - Karl Wallinger, 66, Welsh alternative rock singer-songwriter and multi-instrumentalist (The Waterboys, World Party)
- 11
  - Boss, 54, American rapper
  - Eric Carmen, 74, American power pop singer-songwriter (Raspberries) (death announced on this date)
  - Pete Rodriguez, 91, American Latin boogaloo pianist and bandleader
- 12
  - Michael Knott, American Christian rock singer-songwriter (Lifesavers Underground)
  - James Whitbourn, 60, British classical composer and conductor
  - Russ Wilson, 62, Canadian alternative rock bassist (Junkhouse)
- 13
  - Dick Allix, 78, British pop rock drummer (Vanity Fare)
  - John Blunt, British rock drummer (The Searchers) (death announced on this date)
  - Margaret Curphey, 86, British soprano
  - Sylvain Luc, 58, French jazz guitarist
  - Sadi Mohammad, 70, Bangladeshi Rabindra Sangeet singer and composer
  - Aribert Reimann, 88, German classical composer and pianist
- 14
  - Lamara Chkonia, 93, Georgian opera singer
  - Frank Darcel, 65, French post-punk guitarist (Marquis de Sade)
  - Byron Janis, 95, American classical pianist
  - Jean-Pierre Marty, 91, French classical pianist and conductor
  - Angela McCluskey, 64, Scottish alternative rock singer-songwriter (Wild Colonials)
- 15 – Hans Blum, 95, German schlager singer-songwriter
- 17
  - Cola Boyy, 34, American disco multi-instrumentalist
  - Sandra Crouch, 81, American gospel singer
  - Steve Harley, 73, British glam rock singer-songwriter (Steve Harley & Cockney Rebel)
- 18
  - Jimmy Hastings, 85, British progressive rock multi-instrumentalist (Caravan, Soft Machine, Hatfield and the North)
  - Khalid, 60, Bangladeshi pop singer
  - Kevin Toney, 70, American jazz fusion pianist and composer (The Blackbyrds)
- 19 – Greg Lee, 53, American ska and reggae singer (Hepcat)
- 20
  - Faramarz Aslani, 79, Iranian folk singer and guitarist
  - George Darko, 73, Ghanaian burger-highlife singer-songwriter and guitarist
  - Gene Elders, 80, American country fiddler (Ace in the Hole Band)
  - Cocky Mazzetti, 87, Italian pop singer
- 21 – Laurens van Rooyen, 88, Dutch classical pianist and composer
- 23
  - Igor Ozim, 92, Slovenian classical violinist
  - Maurizio Pollini, 82, Italian classical pianist
- 24
  - Vincent Bonham, 67, American funk singer (Raydio) (death announced on this date)
  - Def Rhymz, 53, Surinamese-Dutch rapper
  - Péter Eötvös, 80, Hungarian opera composer
- 25
  - Humphrey Campbell, 66, Surinamese-Dutch pop singer
  - Chris Cross, 71, English new wave bassist and keyboardist (Ultravox, Tiger Lily)
  - Maurice El Médiouni, 95, Algerian jazz pianist
- 26
  - Clare Elliott, New Zealand punk singer (Suburban Reptiles)
  - Chandra Kumara Kandanarachchi, 76, Sri Lankan playback singer
  - Slađana Milošević, 68, Serbian new wave singer-songwriter
  - George Nicolescu, 74, Romanian pop singer
- 27 – La Castou, 75, Swiss pop singer
- 28 – Marian Zazeela, 83, American experimental music singer and tanpura player
- 29 – Gerry Conway, 76, English folk rock drummer and percussionist (Jethro Tull, Fairport Convention, Cat Stevens, Pentangle).
- 30
  - Mark Spiro, 66–67, American songwriter and record producer (death announced on this date)
  - Vanhlupuii, 77, Indian Mizo multi-genre singer
- 31 – Casey Benjamin, 45, American jazz multi-instrumentalist (Robert Glasper Experiment)

=== April ===
- 1
  - Phil Delire, 67–68, Belgian music producer.
  - Michael Ward, 57, American alternative rock guitarist (The Wallflowers, School of Fish)
- 2 – Jerry Abbott, 81, American country music songwriter and record producer
- 3
  - Joe Aitken, 79, Scottish bothy ballad singer
  - Albert Heath, 88, American jazz drummer (Heath Brothers)
  - Kalevi Kiviniemi, 65, Finnish classical organist
  - Muñequita Milly, 23, Peruvian huayno singer
  - Notker Wolf, 83, German Benedictine priest-monk and rock guitarist
- 4
  - Keith LeBlanc, 69, American multi-genre drummer (Little Axe, Tackhead)
  - Graeme Naysmith, 57, English shoegaze guitarist (Pale Saints)
- 5
  - Phil Nimmons, 100, Canadian jazz clarinetist.
  - Rocket Norton, 73, Canadian hard rock drummer (Prism)
  - C. J. Snare, 64, American glam metal singer-songwriter (FireHouse)
- 6 – Dutty Dior, Norwegian rapper
- 7
  - Michael Boder, 65, German classical conductor
  - Clarence "Frogman" Henry, 87, American R&B singer and pianist
  - Antonette Mendes, 79, Indian tiatr singer
  - Joe Viera, 91, German jazz saxophonist
- 8 – Jon Card, 63, German-born Canadian punk drummer (SNFU, D.O.A., Subhumans)
- 9
  - Bob Lanese, 82, American big band jazz trumpeter (James Last Orchestra)
  - Muluken Melesse, 70, Ethiopian tizita singer and drummer
  - Sturgis Nikides, 66, American blues rock and no wave guitarist (Low Society, Cool It Reba)
  - Dieter Rexroth, 83, German musicologist and dramaturge (Deutsches Symphonie-Orchester Berlin, Young Euro Classic)
  - Max Werner, 70, Dutch progressive rock singer and drummer (Kayak)
- 10 – Mister Cee, 57, American hip hop DJ and radio broadcaster (death announced on this date)
- 11
  - Park Bo-ram, 30, South Korean K-pop singer
  - Enrique Llácer Soler, 89, Spanish jazz percussionist and composer
- 12
  - Lucy Rimmer, British post-punk singer (The Fall) (death announced on this date)
  - Rico Wade, 52, American music producer and songwriter (Organized Noize)
- 13
  - Richard Horowitz, 75, American film composer
  - Lorenzo Palomo, 86, Spanish classical composer
- 14 –
  - Ben Eldridge, 85, American progressive bluegrass banjoist (The Seldom Scene)
  - Calvin Keys, 82, American jazz guitarist
- 15
  - Reita, 42, Japanese alternative metal bassist (The Gazette)
  - Eugene Wolfgramm, 57, American pop singer (The Jets, Boys Club)
- 16
  - Clorofila, 56, Mexican Nortec DJ (Nortec Collective)
  - K. G. Jayan, 89, Indian Carnatic singer
  - Gavin Webb, 77, Australian psychedelic rock bassist (The Masters Apprentices)
- 17 – Pooch Tavares, 81, American R&B and disco singer (Tavares) (death announced on this date)
- 18
  - Dickey Betts, 80, American Southern rock singer-songwriter and guitarist (The Allman Brothers Band)
  - Steve Kille, American stoner rock bassist (Dead Meadow)
  - Mandisa, 47, American gospel singer
  - Larry Page, 86, English pop singer and record producer
- 19
  - Naomy, 46, Romanian pop singer
  - Eddie Sutton, 59, American crossover thrash singer (Leeway)
- 20
  - Kaj Chydenius, 84, Finnish avant garde composer and folk songwriter
  - Tony Tuff, 69, Jamaican reggae singer (The African Brothers)
- 21
  - Jean-Marie Aerts, 72, Belgian rock guitarist (TC Matic)
  - MC Duke, 58, British rapper
  - Alex Hassilev, 91, American folk singer and banjoist (The Limeliters)
  - KODA, 45, Ghanaian gospel singer
- 22 – Chan Romero, 82, American rock and roll singer-songwriter and guitarist (death announced on this date)
- 23 – Fergie MacDonald, 86, Scottish cèilidh accordionist
- 24 – Mike Pinder, 82, English progressive rock keyboardist and songwriter (The Moody Blues)
- 26
  - Robin George, 68, British rock singer and guitarist.
  - Anderson Leonardo, 51, Brazilian pagode singer (Molejo)
  - Frank Wakefield, American bluegrass mandolinist
- 27 – Jean-Pierre Ferland, 89, Canadian folk rock singer-songwriter
- 28 – Norman Carol, 95, American classical violinist and concertmaster (Philadelphia Orchestra)
- 30 – Duane Eddy, 86, American rock and roll guitarist

=== May ===
- 1
  - Hasna El-Bacharia, 74, Algerian diwan sintir player
  - Richard Maloof, 84, American pop and big band bassist and tuba player
  - Uma Ramanan, 69, Indian playback singer
  - Richard Tandy, 76, English rock keyboardist (Electric Light Orchestra, The Move)
- 2
  - Gary Floyd, 71, American hardcore punk and alternative rock singer (Dicks, Sister Double Happiness)
  - John Pisano, 93, American jazz guitarist.
- 3 – Jim Mills, 57, American bluegrass banjoist (Kentucky Thunder)
- 4
  - Miroslav Imrich, 71, Czech rock singer (Abraxas)
  - Ron Kavana, 73, Irish multi-genre singer-songwriter
- 5
  - Belgacem Bouguenna, 61, Tunisian mezwed singer
  - Kelath Aravindakshan Marar, 82, Indian Panchari melam chenda player.
- 6
  - Bill Holman, 96, American jazz and big band saxophonist, composer and arranger
  - Wayland Holyfield, 82, American country songwriter
  - Christiane Stefanski, 74, Belgian folk singer
- 7
  - Steve Albini, 61, American post-hardcore and noise rock singer and guitarist (Big Black, Shellac) and record producer
  - Ignatius Jones, 66–67, Australian-Filipino new wave and swing singer (Jimmy and the Boys, Pardon Me Boys)
  - Jan Ptaszyn Wróblewski, 88, Polish jazz saxophonist, composer and arranger
- 8
  - John Barbata, 79, American rock drummer (The Turtles, Jefferson Airplane, Jefferson Starship)
  - Conrad Kelly, 65, Jamaican-born British reggae drummer (Steel Pulse)
  - Giovanna Marini, 87, Italian folk singer-songwriter
  - Dennis Thompson, 75, American rock drummer (MC5)
- 9 – Fred Noonan, Australian alternative rock drummer (Six Ft Hick)
- 12 – David Sanborn, 78, American jazz saxophonist.
- 13
  - Christian Escoudé, 76, French Gypsy jazz guitarist
  - Luis María Serra, 82, Argentine film composer
- 14 – Jimmy James, 83, Jamaican-British ska and disco singer
- 15
  - John Hawken, 84, English rock keyboardist (The Nashville Teens, Renaissance, Strawbs)
  - Ahmed Piro, 92, Moroccan Andalusi classical singer
- 17
  - Charlie Colin, 58, American pop rock bassist and guitarist (Train, The Side Deal) (body discovered on this date)
  - Missinho, 64, Brazilian Axé singer (Chiclete com Banana)
- 18
  - Palle Danielsson, 77, Swedish jazz bassist
  - Frank Ifield, 86, Australian country singer
  - John Koerner, 85, American blues singer-songwriter and guitarist (Koerner, Ray & Glover)
  - Jon Wysocki, 53, American post-grunge drummer (Staind)
- 19 – Peggi Blu, 77, American R&B singer and vocal coach
- 21 – Jan A. P. Kaczmarek, 71, Polish film composer
- 22 – Toni Montano, 62, Serbian punk rock singer
- 24 – Doug Ingle, 78, American psychedelic rock singer-songwriter and keyboardist (Iron Butterfly)
- 25 – Richard M. Sherman, 95, American film songwriter (Sherman Brothers)
- 27
  - Rodger Fox, 71, New Zealand jazz trombonist and bandleader.
  - Francesco Petrozzi, 62, Peruvian opera singer
- 28 – Gustavo Mullem, 72, Brazilian punk rock guitarist (Camisa de Vênus)
- 29
  - Cayouche, 75, Canadian country singer-songwriter
  - Mansour Seck, 69, Senegalese worldbeat singer and Kora player.
- 30 – Doug Dagger, 56, American punk rock singer (The Generators)
- 31 – Ed Mann, 70, American rock drummer and keyboardist (Frank Zappa)

=== June ===
- 1 – Harry van Hoof, 81, Dutch pop conductor, composer, and music arranger.
- 2
  - Emma Lou Diemer, 96, American classical composer
  - Colin Gibb, 70, British pop singer and guitarist (Black Lace)
- 3 – Brother Marquis, 58, American rapper (2 Live Crew).
- 4 – C.Gambino, 26, Swedish rapper
- 5 – Ranch Sironi, American stoner rock bassist (Nebula)
- 7
  - Rose-Marie, 68, Northern Irish pop singer (death announced on this date)
  - Ernstalbrecht Stiebler, 90, German minimalist composer
- 8
  - Mark James, 83, American pop and country songwriter
  - Charlie Lennon, 85, Irish traditional folk fiddler and composer
- 9
  - William Carragan, 86, American musicologist and Bruckner expert
  - Alex Riel, 83, Danish jazz and rock drummer
- 11
  - Enchanting, 26, American rapper
  - Marcel Guilloux, 93, French kan ha diskan singer and storyteller.
  - Françoise Hardy, 80, French pop and yé-yé singer-songwriter
  - Gaps Hendrickson, 73, British ska singer (The Selecter)
  - Adam Lewis, 45, American pop punk bassist (Fenix TX) (death announced on this date)
  - Kevork Mardirossian, 70, American classical violinist
  - Rajeev Taranath, 91, Indian classical sarod player
- 12 – Johnny Canales, 77, Mexican Tejano singer
- 13
  - Angela Bofill, 70, American R&B singer-songwriter
  - Skowa, 68, Brazilian samba rock singer-songwriter and guitarist (Trio Mocotó)
- 14 – Jeremy Tepper, 60, American radio executive and country singer, co-founder of Diesel Only Records
- 16
  - Buzz Cason, 84, American pop and country singer-songwriter
  - Jodie Devos, 35, Belgian opera singer
- 17 – Paul Spencer, 53, English house DJ (Dario G)
- 18 – James Chance, 71, American no wave singer and saxophonist (James Chance and the Contortions, Teenage Jesus and the Jerks)
- 19
  - Chrystian, 67, Brazilian sertanejo singer
  - Silvia Infantas, 101, Chilean folk singer
  - James Loughran, 92, Scottish classical conductor
- 20 – Margarita Voites, 87, Estonian opera singer
- 23
  - Julio Foolio, 26, American rapper
  - Sakini Ramachandraih, 61, Indian folk singer and dhol player
  - David Tunley, 94, Australian musicologist.
- 24
  - Shifty Shellshock, 49, American rap rock singer-songwriter and rapper (Crazy Town)
  - Rob Stone, 55, American record producer
- 25
  - Jewel Brown, 86, American jazz and blues singer
  - Ray St. Germain, 83, Canadian country singer
- 26 – Gary Grant, American jazz trumpeter
- 27
  - Kinky Friedman, 79, American country singer-songwriter
  - Alexander Knaifel, 80, Russian opera composer
  - Martin Mull, 80, American comedy music singer-songwriter
- 28
  - Lando Bartolini, 87, Italian opera singer
  - Kong Nay, 80, Cambodian traditional folk chapei dang veng player
  - Betty Veldpaus, 72, Dutch pop and country singer (Pussycat)
- 29 – Martti Wallén, 75, Finnish opera singer
- 30
  - Lucius Banda, 53, Malawian reggae singer-songwriter
  - Peter Collins, 73, English record producer (death announced on this date)

=== July ===
- 1
  - Fausto Bordalo Dias, 75, Portuguese folk singer-songwriter
  - Nino Vella, 31, French classical and jazz composer
  - Cliff Waldron, 83, American bluegrass singer and guitarist
- 2 – Tom Fowler, 73, American psychedelic rock bassist (The Mothers of Invention, It's a Beautiful Day, Air Pocket)
- 3 – Mark Germino, 73, American folk rock singer-songwriter
- 5 – Liana Isakadze, 77, Georgian classical violinist (death announced on this date)
- 6
  - Pino D'Angiò, 71, Italian Italo disco singer-songwriter
  - Joe Egan, 77, Scottish folk rock singer-songwriter and guitarist (Stealers Wheel)
- 8
  - Adrián Olivares, 48, Mexican pop singer (Menudo).
  - Pavol Zelenay, 96, Slovak swing composer
- 9 – Joe Bonsall, 76, American country and gospel singer (The Oak Ridge Boys)
- 10 – Dave Loggins, 76, American pop and country singer-songwriter
- 11 – Tommy Drennan, 82–83, Irish classical and showband singer
- 13
  - Ruth Hesse, 87, German opera singer
  - Claudio Reyes, 64, Chilean pop singer
- 14 – R. P. S. Lanrue, 74, German rock guitarist (Ton Steine Scherben)
- 15
  - Wieteke van Dort, 81, Dutch pop singer
  - Édith Lejet, 82, French classical composer
  - Tomcraft, 49, German progressive trance DJ and producer
- 16
  - Ulf Dageby, 80, Swedish rock guitarist (Nationalteatern)
  - Bernice Johnson Reagon, 81, American gospel a capella singer (The Freedom Singers, Sweet Honey in the Rock)
  - Irène Schweizer, 83, Swiss free jazz pianist.
- 17
  - Pinche Peach, 57, American death metal singer (Brujeria)
  - Happy Traum, 86, American folk singer and guitarist
  - Heather Wood, 79, English folk singer (The Young Tradition) (death announced on this date)
- 18 – Jerry Fuller, 85, American rockabilly and pop singer-songwriter and producer
- 19 – Toumani Diabaté, 58, Malian mande kora player
- 20
  - Jerry Miller, 81, American psychedelic rock singer-songwriter and guitarist (Moby Grape, The Rhythm Dukes)
  - Sandy Posey, 80, American pop and country singer
  - Eugene Sârbu, 73, Romanian classical violinist.
- 21
  - Kim Min-ki, 73, South Korean folk rock singer-songwriter
  - Evelyn Thomas, 70, American Hi-NRG singer
- 22
  - Jerzy Artysz, 93, Polish opera singer
  - Klara Berkovich, 96, Soviet-born American classical violinist
  - Duke Fakir, 88, American R&B singer (Four Tops)
  - Elena Mauti Nunziata, 77, Italian opera singer
  - John Mayall, 90, English blues rock singer-songwriter and guitarist
- 23 – Ekaterina Shklyaeva, 86, Russian folk pop singer (Buranovskiye Babushki) (death announced on this date)
- 24
  - Shafin Ahmed, 63, Bangladeshi rock singer-songwriter and bassist (Miles)
  - Antonio Cabán Vale, 81, Puerto Rican folk singer-songwriter and guitarist
  - Bill Crook, Canadian alternative metal and pop punk bassist (Spiritbox, Living With Lions). (death announced on this date)
- 25
  - Pascal Danel, 80, French pop singer-songwriter
  - Benjamin Luxon, 87, British opera singer
  - Tadashi Yabe, 59, Japanese acid jazz DJ and music producer (United Future Organization).
- 26
  - Jason Clark, American gospel singer (The Nelons).
  - Sd Laika, American deconstructed club producer and DJ (death announced on this date)
  - Kelly Nelon Clark, 64, American gospel singer (The Nelons)
  - Amber Nelon Thompson, American gospel singer (The Nelons)
  - Tomáš Vendl, 52, Czech black metal bassist (Master's Hammer)
- 27
  - Pat Collier, 72, English punk rock bassist (The Vibrators) and record producer
  - Danny Clarke, 71–72, Jamaican reggae singer (The Meditations)
  - DJ Polo, American hip hop DJ (Juice Crew) and record producer
  - Oldřich Janota, 74, Czech folk singer-songwriter
  - Mísia, 69, Portuguese fado singer
  - Wolfgang Rihm, 72, German classical composer
- 28
  - Chino XL, 50, American rapper
  - Martin Phillipps, 61, New Zealand indie pop singer-songwriter and guitarist (The Chills) (death announced on this date)
  - Mick Underwood, 78, English rock drummer (Quatermass, Strapps, Gillan)
- 30 – Onyeka Onwenu, 72, Nigerian pop and gospel singer-songwriter
- 31
  - DJ Randall, 54, British jungle and drum and bass DJ
  - Arthur Miles, 74, American R&B and jazz singer
  - Carmen Pateña, 83, Filipino pop singer

=== August ===
- 1 – Jürgen Ahrend, 94, German pipe organ builder
- 2 – Nicu Covaci, 77, Romanian rock singer-songwriter and guitarist (Transsylvania Phoenix)
- 3
  - Shaun Martin, 45, American jazz fusion and gospel multi-instrumentalist (Snarky Puppy)
  - Antônio Meneses, 66, Brazilian classical cellist (Beaux Arts Trio)
  - Phloen Phromdaen, 85, Thai luk thung singer
- 4 – Miguel Ángel Gómez Martínez, 74, Spanish classical conductor and composer
- 5 – Maurice Williams, 86, American doo-wop singer-songwriter (Maurice Williams and the Zodiacs)
- 7 – Jack Russell, 63, American glam metal singer (Great White)
- 9
  - Carl Bevan, 51, Welsh Britpop drummer (60 Ft. Dolls) (death announced on this date)
  - Maryvonne Le Dizès, 84, French classical violinist
  - Charles R. Cross, 67, American music journalist
  - Dave Sweetapple, 58, American indie rock and stoner metal bassist (Sweet Apple, Witch).
  - Carl Weathersby, 71, American blues guitarist
- 10 – Celestina Casapietra, 85, Italian opera singer
- 11
  - Gökçe Akçelik, 47, Turkish psychedelic rock singer and guitarist (Replikas)
  - Haniya Aslam, 46, Pakistani pop rock singer and guitarist (Zeb and Haniya)
  - Steve Davislim, 57, Malaysian-born Australian opera singer (death announced on this day)
  - Talos, 37, Irish indie electronic singer-songwriter and multi-instrumentalist
  - Chon Travis, American punk singer (Love Equals Death)
- 12
  - Christof Nel, 80, German theatre and opera director
  - Zdeněk Pololáník, 88, Czech classical composer, conductor and organist.
- 13 – Greg Kihn, 75, American power pop singer-songwriter and guitarist (The Greg Kihn Band)
- 14 – Dean Roberts, 49, New Zealand electroacoustic multi-instrumentalist and composer (death announced on this date)
- 15
  - Joe Chambers, 81, American psychedelic soul singer-songwriter (The Chambers Brothers)
  - Peter Marshall, 98, American pop singer and musical theater actor
- 16
  - Charles Blackwell, 84, English pop arranger, record producer, film composer and songwriter (death announced on this date)
  - Bobby Hicks, 91, American bluegrass fiddler
  - Luther Kent, 76, American blues singer
  - Rajko Maksimović, 89, Serbian classical composer
  - Tore Ylwizaker, 54, Norwegian experimental rock keyboardist (Ulver)
- 17
  - Johnny "Dandy" Rodríguez, 78, American Afro-Cuban jazz and salsa bongo player (Típica 73).
  - Bert Susanka, 62, American surf rock and cowpunk singer-songwriter and guitarist (The Ziggens)
- 20
  - Erik Barrett, 48, American metalcore bassist (100 Demons) (death announced on this date)
  - Maryvonne Le Dizès, 84, French classical violinist (death announced on this date)
  - Manju Mehta, 79, Indian classical sitar player.
  - Charin Nantanakorn, 91, Thai pop singer
- 21
  - Diana, 76, Brazilian pop singer
  - Russell Stone, 77–78, English singer (R&J Stone)
- 22 – Justin Chearno, 54, American indie rock guitarist (Pitchblende, Turing Machine, Unrest, Panthers)
- 23
  - Daron Beck, 48, American synth-doom singer and keyboardist (Pinkish Black)
  - Russell Malone, 60, America jazz guitarist
  - Catherine Ribeiro, 82, French psychedelic rock singer (Catherine Ribeiro + Alpes)
- 26 – Paul Dwayne, 60, Canadian country singer-songwriter
- 27
  - Richard Macphail, 73, English rock singer (Anon) and road manager (Genesis)
  - Makaya Ntshoko, 84, South African jazz drummer
- 30
  - Fatman Scoop, 53, American rapper
  - Danielle Moore, 52, English downtempo singer (Crazy P)
  - Cunnie Williams, 61, American R&B singer (death announced on this date)
- 31 – Jessica Mbangeni, 47, South African gospel singer

=== September ===
- 1
  - Mike Billard, 60, Canadian jazz drummer (Jeff Johnston Trio).
  - Teresa Bright, 64, American hapa haole guitarist and ukulele player.
- 2
  - James Darren, 88, American pop singer
  - Peter Kubik, 49, Austrian black metal guitarist (Abigor) (death announced on this date)
  - Pat Lewis, 76, American soul singer (death announced on this date)
- 3 – Göran Fristorp, 76, Swedish schlager singer-songwriter (Malta)
- 4
  - Oswald d'Andréa, 90, French classical pianist and film composer
  - Bora Đorđević, 71, Serbian hard rock singer-songwriter (Riblja Čorba).
- 5
  - Roy Cape, 82, Trinidadian calypso saxophonist (death announced on this date)
  - Herbie Flowers, 86, English rock bassist (Blue Mink, T. Rex, Sky).
  - Martin France, 60, British jazz drummer
  - Sérgio Mendes, 83, Brazilian bossa nova pianist and composer
  - Rich Homie Quan, 34, American rapper
  - Władysław Słowiński, 94, Polish classical composer and conductor.
- 6
  - Will Jennings, 80, American pop lyricist
  - Mark Moffatt, 74, Australian pop guitarist (The Monitors) and record producer
  - Screamin' Scott Simon, 75, Americanrock and roll pianist and singer (Sha Na Na)
- 7
  - Jimmy Gilmer, 83, American rock and roll singer (The Fireballs)
  - Dan Morgenstern, 94, German-born American music journalist and archivist
- 8
  - Viktor Lyadov, 58, Russian classical pianist
  - Zoot Money, 82, English blues rock singer and keyboardist (Eric Burdon and The Animals, Zoot Money's Big Roll Band)
  - Ben Thapa, 42, English operatic pop singer (G4)
  - Caterina Valente, 93, French-Italian pop singer and guitarist
- 10
  - Frankie Beverly, 77, American R&B and funk singer-songwriter (Maze)
  - Doug Hood, 70, New Zealand record producer
- 12
  - Robin Guy, 54, British punk and alternative rock drummer (Sham 69, All About Eve)
  - Papa Kojak, 68, Jamaican reggae singer
- 13
  - Moisés Canelo, 74, Honduran pop singer-songwriter
  - Tommy Cash, 84, American country singer
  - Chalmers Davis, 73, American country keyboardist (The Shooters)
- 15
  - David Davis, 63, American bluegrass mandolinist
  - Tito Jackson, 70, American pop and R&B singer and guitarist (The Jackson 5)
  - Roli Mosimann, 68, Swiss-born American experimental rock drummer (Swans, Wiseblood) and record producer
- 16 – Billy Edd Wheeler, 91, American country singer-songwriter
- 17
  - Evin Agassi, 78, Iranian-born American pop singer.
  - Kenny Hyslop, 73, Scottish new wave drummer (Slik, Zones, Simple Minds, Set the Tone) (death announced on this date)
  - Rise Kagona, 62, Zimbabwean jit guitarist (Bhundu Boys)
  - JD Souther, 78, American country rock singer-songwriter
- 18
  - Juan Brujo, 61, American death metal singer (Brujeria)
  - Dick Diamonde, 76, Dutch-born Australian rock bassist (The Easybeats)
  - Nick Gravenites, 85, American blues singer and guitarist (The Electric Flag, Big Brother and the Holding Company)
  - Zulya Kamalova, 55, Russian-born Australian folk singer
- 19 – Florence Warner, 77, American pop and commercial jingle singer
- 20
  - Richard Dyer, 82, American music critic
  - Srirangam Kannan, 72, Indian classical morsing player
  - Kim Richmond, 84, American jazz saxophonist and composer
  - Sayuri, 28, Japanese pop singer-songwriter
- 21
  - Paul Cripple, American anarcho-punk guitarist (Reagan Youth)
  - Benny Golson, 95, American jazz saxophonist and composer
  - Eddie Low, 81, New Zealand country singer
  - Roger Palm, 75, Swedish pop drummer (ABBA)
  - Juan Carlos Salazar, 59, Venezuelan folk singer and cuatro player
- 23 – Freddie Salem, 70, American Southern rock guitarist (Outlaws) (death announced on this date)
- 24 – Cat Glover, 60, American funk singer and rapper
- 27
  - John McNeil, 76, American jazz trumpeter
  - Pit Passarell, 56, Argentine-born Brazilian heavy metal singer and bassist (Viper)
- 28 – Kris Kristofferson, 88, American country singer-songwriter
- 29
  - Rohan de Saram, 85, British-born classical Sri Lankan cellist
  - Martin Lee, 77, English pop singer-songwriter (Brotherhood of Man)
  - Stoika Milanova, 79, Bulgarian classical violinist (death announced on this date)
- 30
  - Dave Allison, 68, Canadian heavy metal guitarist (Anvil)
  - Fayo, 46, Canadian folk singer-songwriter

=== October ===
- 1
  - Vyacheslav Dobrynin, 78, Russian pop rock singer and composer (Samotsvety)
  - Fritz Escovão, 81, Brazilian samba rock singer and guitarist (Trio Mocotó)
- 2
  - Arbogaste Mbella Ntone, 82, Cameroonian gospel singer
  - Ken Tobias, 79, Canadian folk singer-songwriter
- 3
  - Terje Bjørklund, 79, Norwegian jazz pianist and composer
  - Jack Colwell, 34, Australian indie rock singer-songwriter.
  - Jerry Miller, American ska singer (The Untouchables)
- 5 – Mimis Plessas, 99, Greek film composer and classical pianist
- 6 – Johnny Neel, 70, American Southern rock singer and keyboardist (The Allman Brothers Band)
- 7
  - Hans van Hemert, 79, Dutch music producer and songwriter
  - Cissy Houston, 91, American gospel and R&B singer (The Sweet Inspirations)
  - Jack Ponti, 66, American songwriter and record producer
- 8 – Jorge Arriagada, 81, Chilean-French film composer
- 9
  - Michel Boyibanda, 84, Congolese rumba and soukous singer (TPOK Jazz).
  - Bruno Pochesci, 54, Italian-born French singer-songwriter
  - Leif Segerstam, 80, Finnish classical conductor, composer and multi-instrumentalist
- 10
  - Adam Abeshouse, 63, American recording engineer, music producer and classical violinist
  - El Taiger, 37, Cuban reggaeton singer
- 11
  - Kiril Marichkov, 79, Bulgarian progressive rock singer and bassist (Shturcite)
  - Aminollah Rashidi, 99, Iranian classical singer and composer
- 12
  - Jackmaster, 38, Scottish house DJ
  - Ka, 52, American rapper
- 13 – Libby Titus, 77, American pop singer-songwriter
- 15 – Ollie Olsen, 66, Australian post-punk multi-instrumentalist (No, Whirlywirld, Max Q, Orchestra of Skin and Bone, Taipan Tiger Girls) and film composer
- 16
  - Inger Lorre, 61, American alternative rock singer-songwriter (Nymphs)
  - Alan Mansfield, 72, American-New Zealand rock keyboardist (Dragon), songwriter, and record producer
  - Liam Payne, 31, English pop singer (One Direction)
- 18 – Shujeo Shyam, 78, Bangladeshi music director
- 20
  - Barbara Dane, 97, American jazz, blues, and folk singer
  - Janusz Olejniczak, 72, Polish classical pianist
- 21
  - Egidio Cuadrado, 71, Colombian vallenato accordionist
  - Paul Di'Anno, 66, English heavy metal singer (Iron Maiden)
  - Mimi Hines, 91, Canadian pop singer and musical theater actress
  - Barbara Kolb, 85, American classical composer
- 22
  - Claire Daly, 66, American jazz saxophonist and composer
  - Edd Griles, 78, American music video director
  - Ferenc Sánta Jr., 79, Hungarian classical and Romani folk violinist
- 23
  - Jack Jones, 86, American pop singer
  - Linda LaFlamme, 85, American psychedelic rock keyboardist and songwriter (It's a Beautiful Day)
- 24
  - DJ Clark Kent, 57, Panamanian–American hip hop DJ and record producer
  - Marco Paulo, 79, Portuguese pop singer
  - Hans Rotmo, 76, Norwegian folk rock singer-songwriter
- 25 – Phil Lesh, 84, American psychedelic rock singer-songwriter and bassist (Grateful Dead)
- 26 – Ustad Tafu, 79, Pakistani classical tabla player and film score composer
- 28
  - Bill Beach, 92, American rockabilly singer and guitarist (death announced on this date)
  - Manuel "Guajiro" Mirabal, 91, Cuban guajira trumpeter (Buena Vista Social Club)
- 30
  - Richard Andrew, 58, Australian indie rock drummer (Underground Lovers, Crow, Black Cab)
  - Arthur Moreira Lima, 84, Brazilian classical pianist
- 31 – Candy Devine, 85, Australian radio broadcaster and pop singer (death announced on this date)

=== November ===
- 3
  - Quincy Jones, 91, American record producer, songwriter, arranger, and jazz trumpeter
  - Andy Leek, 66, English new wave keyboardist (Dexys Midnight Runners).
- 4
  - Johnny Madsen, 73, Danish rock singer-songwriter
  - Tyka Nelson, 64, American R&B singer
  - Renato Serio, 78, Italian film composer
- 5 – Sharda Sinha, 72, Indian folk and classical singer
- 8
  - Musafir Ram Bhardwaj, 94, Indian folk drummer
  - George Bohanon, 87, American jazz trombonist
- 9
  - Lou Donaldson, 98, American jazz saxophonist
  - Ella Jenkins, 100, American folk singer-songwriter
  - Ram Narayan, 96, Indian classical sarangi player
- 10
  - Pepe Justicia, 64, Spanish flamenco guitarist
  - Emre Tukur, 55, Turkish pop keyboardist (Klips ve Onlar) (death announced on this date)
- 11 – Papa Noël Nedule, 83, Congolese soukous guitarist.
- 12
  - Johnny Duhan, 74, Irish folk singer-songwriter
  - Roy Haynes, 99, American jazz drummer
- 13
  - Edgard Brito, 50, Brazilian folk metal keyboardist (Tuatha de Danann)
  - Shel Talmy, 87, American record producer
- 14
  - Tommy Alverson, American country singer-songwriter
  - Dennis Bryon, 75, Welsh rock drummer (Amen Corner, Bee Gees)
  - Vic Flick, 87, English session guitarist
  - Peter Sinfield, 80, English progressive rock lyricist (King Crimson) and record producer
- 15 – Aashish Khan, 84, Indian classical sarod player
- 16
  - S. Atan, 75, Singaporean-born Malaysian songwriter
  - Dejan Despić, 94, Serbian classical composer
  - Gerry Weil, 85, Austrian-born Venezuelan jazz pianist
- 17 – Vladimir Lyovkin, 57, Russian pop singer (Na Na)
- 18
  - Paulo Alexandre, 93, Portuguese pop singer
  - Jordi Bonell, 66, Spanish jazz guitarist
  - Charles Dumont, 95, French cabaret and chanson singer-songwriter
  - J. Saul Kane, 55, English trip hop and breakbeat hardcore DJ (death announced on this date)
  - Bjørn Müller, 64, Norwegian rock singer (Backstreet Girls)
  - György Pauk, 88, Hungarian classical violinist
  - Colin Petersen, 78, Australian pop rock drummer (Bee Gees, Humpy Bong)
- 19
  - Cesare Bonizzi, 78, Italian heavy metal singer
  - Odile Bailleux, 84, French classical harpsichordist and organist
  - Diva Gray, 72, American disco singer (Change, Chic)
  - Saafir, 54, American rapper
  - Graciela Susana, 71, Argentine tango singer
- 20
  - Ita Beausang, 88, Irish musicologist
  - Andy Paley, 72, American power pop multi-instrumentalist (The Paley Brothers, The Modern Lovers), songwriter, record producer, and composer
  - Mike Pinera, 76, American rock guitarist and songwriter (Blues Image, Iron Butterfly, Ramatam)
- 21 – Willy Quiroga, 84, Argentine rock bassist (Vox Dei)
- 22
  - Toni Price, 63, American country blues singer
  - Harry Williams, 80, American R&B singer (Bloodstone)
- 23
  - Marius Bațu, 65, Romanian folk singer (Pasărea Colibri
  - Gabriel Cotabiță, 69, Romanian pop singer
  - Pavel Karmanov, 54, Russian classical composer
  - Chuck Woolery, 83, American psychedelic pop singer (The Avant-Garde).
- 24
  - Ahmad Nawab, 92, Malaysian jazz saxophonist and composer
  - Siegfried Thiele, 90, German classical composer
- 25 – Jaroslav Jeroným Neduha, 79, Czech folk singer-songwriter
- 26
  - Bob Bryar, 44, American alternative rock drummer (My Chemical Romance) (body discovered on this date)
  - Leah Kunkel, 76, American folk and pop rock singer (The Coyote Sisters)
- 27
  - Artt Frank, 91, American jazz drummer
  - Leonor González Mina, 90, Colombian cumbia singer
- 29
  - Will Cullen Hart, 53, American indie rock singer-songwriter and guitarist (The Olivia Tremor Control, Circulatory System), co-founder of Elephant 6.
  - Bert De Coninck, 75, Belgian rock singer and guitarist
- 30 – Steve Alaimo, 84, American pop singer and record producer

=== December ===
- 1
  - Jacques Barsamian, 81, French rock singer and music journalist
  - Samantha Lawrence, 55, British hip hop and reggae singer (Wee Papa Girl Rappers)
- 2
  - Liu Chia-chang, 81 or 84, Taiwanese songwriter
  - Marlos Nobre, 85, Brazilian classical composer and pianist
- 3 – Huang Zhun, 98, Chinese classical composer and singer
- 5 – Mario Tessuto, 81, Italian pop singer
- 6
  - Angela Alvarez, 97, Cuban-born American folk-pop singer
  - Miho Nakayama, 54, Japanese pop singer
  - Dickie Rock, 88, Irish pop rock singer (The Miami Showband)
- 7 – Steady Bongo, 58, Sierra Leonean afropop singer
- 9 – Thomas Hertel, 73, German classical composer
- 10 – Lennie De Ice, 54, British jungle DJ (death announced on this date)
- 11
  - Corinne Allal, 69, Tunisian-born Israeli rock singer and guitarist
  - Michio Mamiya, 95, Japanese opera composer
- 12
  - Papia Sarwar, 72, Bangladeshi Rabindra Sangeet singer
  - Martial Solal, 97, French jazz pianist
- 13
  - Koko Ateba, Cameroonian bikutsi singer and guitarist
  - Bill Kelly, 74, American rock singer and guitarist (The Buoys, Dakota)
  - Jon Camp, 75, British progressive rock singer and bassist (Renaissance)
- 15
  - Zakir Hussain, 73, Indian classical and jazz fusion tabla player (Shakti)
  - Ankaralı Turgut, 61, Turkish folk singer
- 16
  - Naa Amanua, 75–76, Ghanaian folk singer (Wulomei)
  - Anita Bryant, 84, American pop singer
  - Steve Lewinson, 60, British soul bassist (Simply Red)
  - Ruth McArdle, Belgian acid house singer (Lords of Acid) (death announced on this date)
- 17
  - Alfa Anderson, 78, American disco singer (Chic)
  - Mike Brewer, 80, American folk rock singer-songwriter (Brewer & Shipley)
  - David Mallett, 73, American folk singer-songwriter
- 18
  - Slim Dunlap, 73, American alternative rock guitarist (The Replacements)
  - Sigrid Kehl, 95, German opera singer
  - Heikki Silvennoinen, 70, Finnish progressive rock guitarist (Tabula Rasa)
- 19
  - Stanley Booth, 82, American music journalist
  - Gaboro, 23, Swedish rapper
- 20 – Sugar Pie DeSanto, 89, American R&B singer
- 21 – Casey Chaos, 59, American punk and metal singer (Amen, Christian Death)
- 23 – Gerardo Guevara, 94, Ecuadorian classical composer
- 24
  - Richard Perry, 82, American record producer
  - Priya Suriyasena, 80, Sri Lankan pop singer
- 25 – Dulce, 69, Mexican pop singer
- 26 – OG Maco, 32, American rapper
- 28
  - Selami Karaibrahimgil, 80, Turkish rock singer (Modern Folk Üçlüsü)
  - Lars Martin Myhre, 68, Norwegian folk singer-songwriter and guitarist
  - Barre Phillips, 90, American jazz bassist
- 29
  - Eric Carlson, 66, American heavy metal guitarist (Mentors)
  - Linda Lavin, 87, American pop singer
- 30 – Joe Grech, 90, Maltese pop singer
- 31
  - Tom Johnson, 85, American minimalist composer
  - Don Nix, 83, American soul singer-songwriter and multi-instrumentalist (The Mar-Keys)
  - Johnnie Walker, 79, English radio disc jockey

== See also ==
- Timeline of musical events
- Women in music
