= Dezső Lehota =

Hungarian violinist, concertmaster, and music teacher

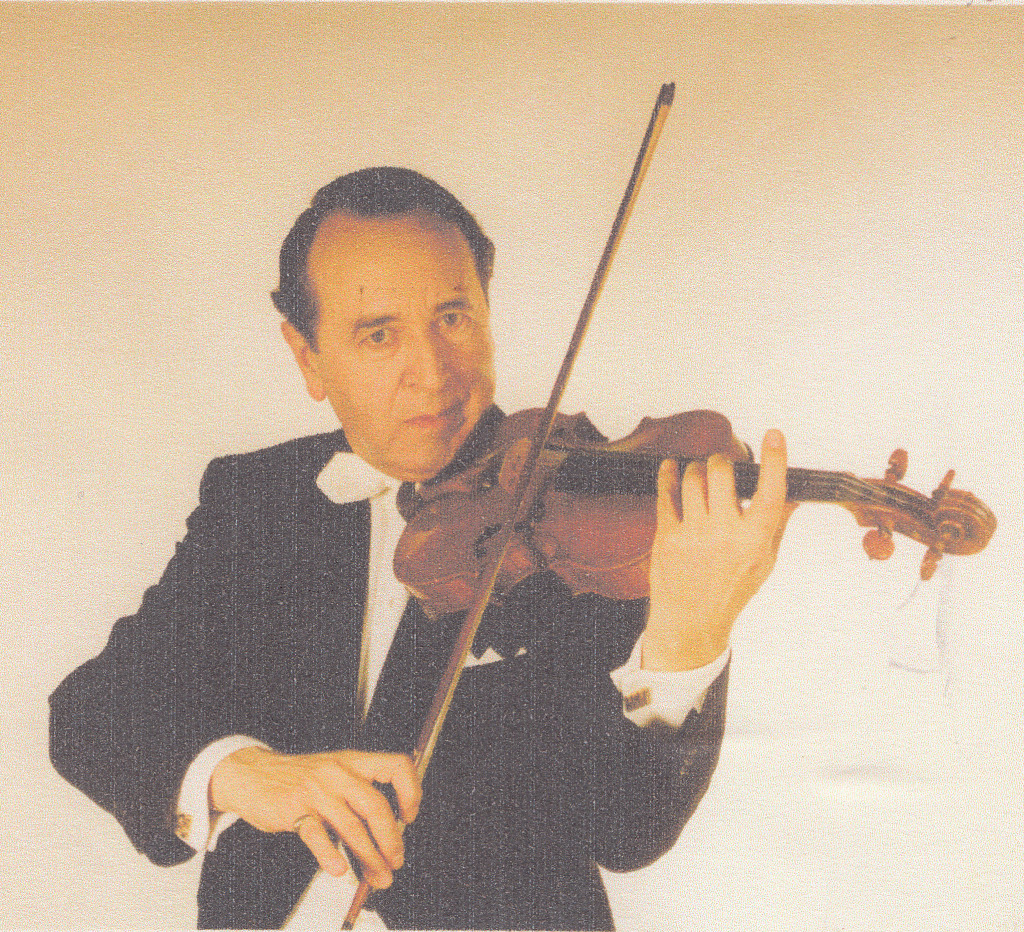
Dezső Lehota with his instrument

Dezső Lehota (7 August 1919 — 15 July 2015) was a Hungarian violinist, concertmaster, and music teacher.

== Biography ==
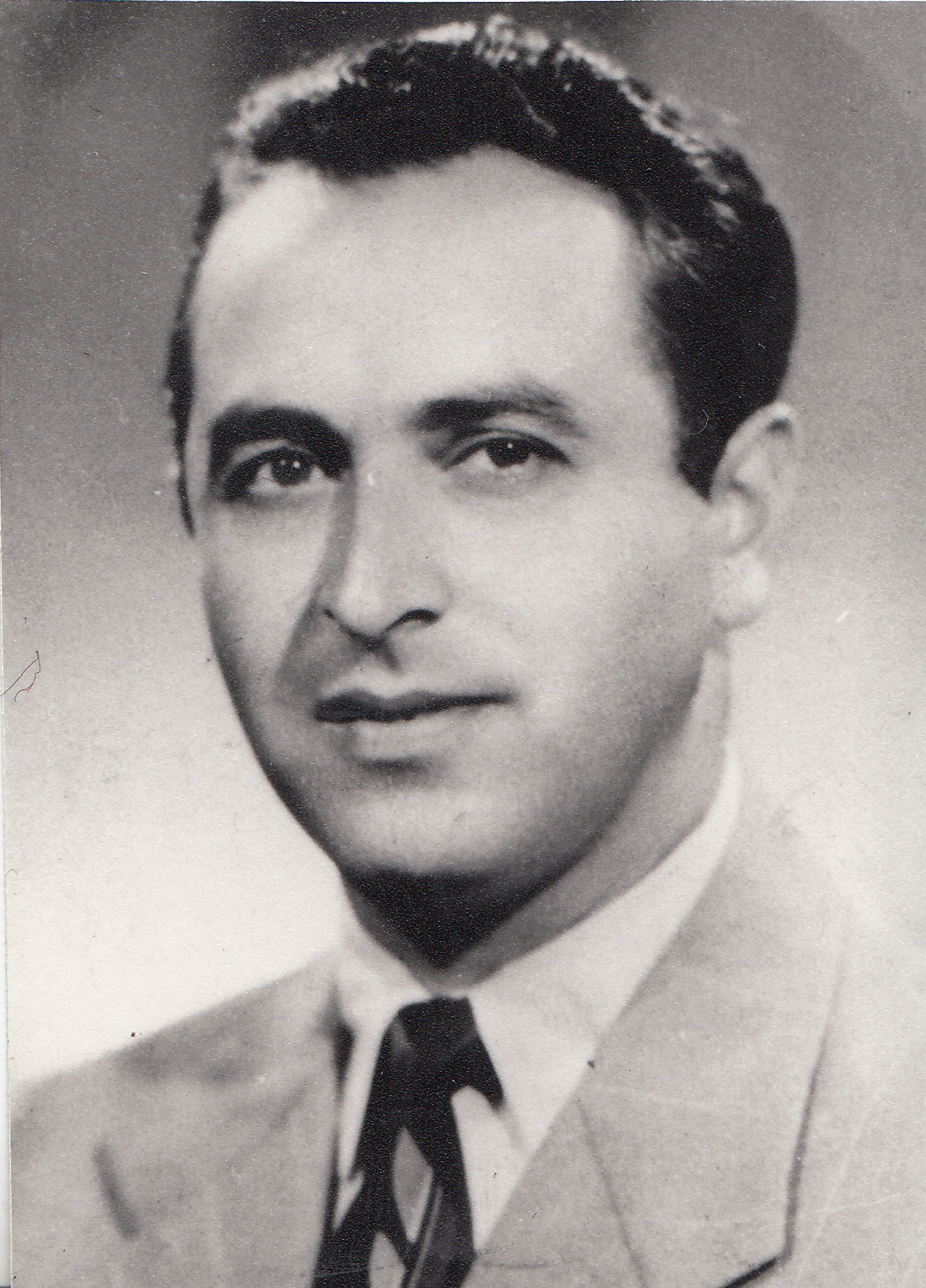
Matriculation photograph of Dezső Lehota

Dezső Lehota began his musical studies at the encouragement of his parents at Hódmezővásárhely, and continued them in the conservatory of Szeged under the mentoring of Miklós Budaházi-Fehér. In addition to that he took private lessons with Jenö Hubay, one of the most important Hungarian violinists and teachers.

In 1934 he won first place of the National Music Festival with Paganini's Violin Concerto in D-major.

In 1937 he obtained the concertmaster's position in the BM Symphonic Orchestra, Budapest. Parallel to his work, he was accepted to the National Hungarian Academy of Music, continuing his studies under the tutorship of Béla Katona.

In 1940 he was conscripted into the Royal Hungarian Army's Orchestra. He surrendered in 1945 in Hungary to the Red Army, to be held in captivity for four more years.

In 1950 he was released and able to carry on with his studies under Béla Katona, at the Academy of Music.

In 1955 he moved to Kaposvár, gaining a department head position in the Franz Liszt Music School. Besides this work, he also taught in the Teacher Training College of Kaposvár. Outside of teaching, he fulfilled concertmaster duties in the Gergely Csiki Theatre.

In 1958 he became the soloist and leader of the orchestra of the Symphonic Orchestra of Kaposvár.

In February 1967 he applied for a position mentioned in an advertisement published in the magazine Das Orchester a position for concertmaster in the concert orchestra 'Pfälzische Philharmonie, Staatsorchester Rheinland-Pfalz' (See more here). He counted this as one of his greatest successes, that despite being 48 years old, he was selected from among seventeen other applicants, with an age-rebate and a sample material doubled by himself. He played here from February 1967 to September 1987.

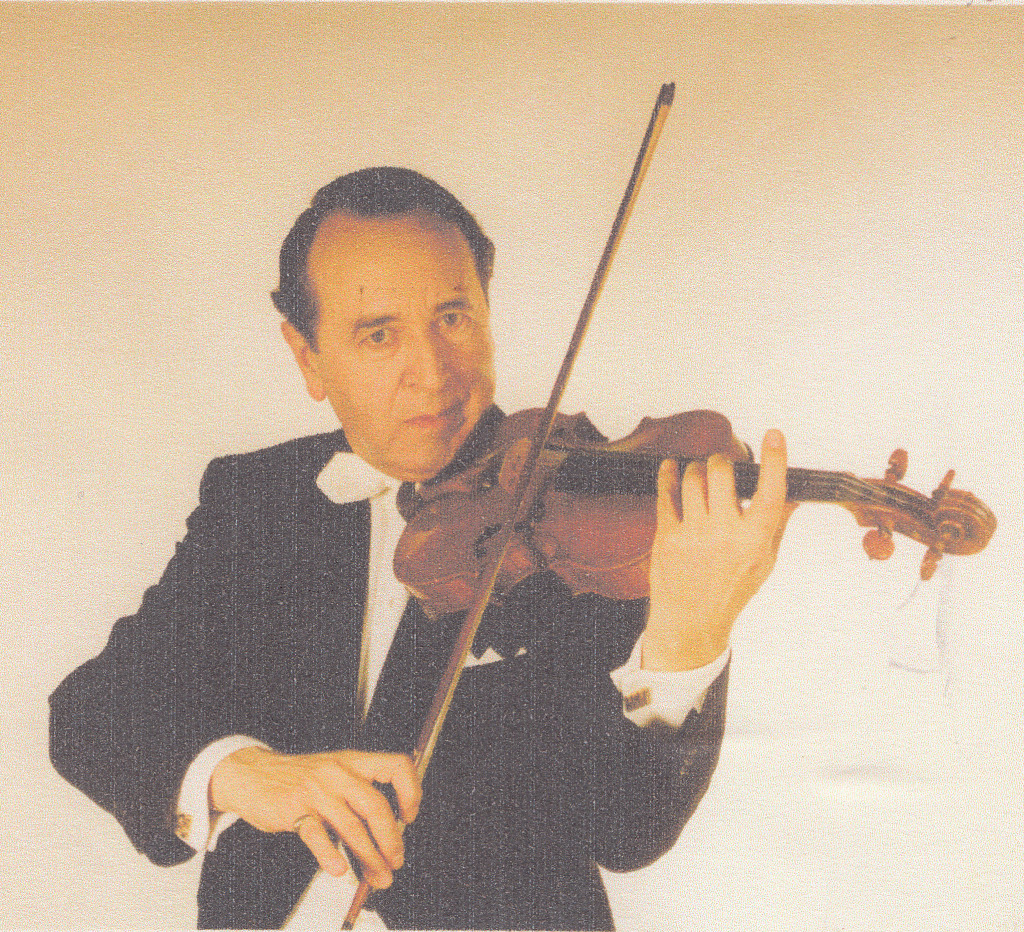
Lehota as a musician

From 1982 onwards, in addition to his position in the philharmonics, he was also a teacher and later department head at the Municipal School of Music in Frankenthal, where after finishing his orchestral career, he could continue teaching for some time with special ministerial allowance. There numerous professional violinists were educated and trained by him.

In September 1998 he retired and moved back to Hungary.

After a short period of illness, deceased on 15 July 2015.

== Samples of his Music ==
Khatchaturian Violin Concerto D-minor

Beethoven Violin Concerto D-major

Tschaikowski Violin Concerto D-major

Mendelssohn Violin Concerto D-minor

== Some of his Better Known Students ==
Sánta Ferenc jr. (1945-), gypsy musician, violinist, leader of the National Gypsy Orchestra. He was a student from the age of 7 at the Franz Liszt Musical School in Kaposvár, and a member of the symphonic orchestra at 17. Later he continued his studies at Pécs.

Dinu Hartwich (1964-), German violinist, chamber musician. He received a 'comprehensive violin education' from Dezső Lehota and Wanda Wilkomirska. Later he taught (and teaches currently) at multiple schools of music in Germany. His students won more than 150 prizes in national competitions.

László Csupor (1933-2008), woodwind musician, and a former principal of the School of Music of Kaposvár - Dezső Lehota recognized him as a concertmaster and he aided in his studies later on.

== Notes ==
Lehota Dezső önéletrajza. Kézirat, Szeged, 2013.

Interview with Sánta Ferenc jr. (Interjú ifj. Sánta Ferenccel.) kethane.webnode.hu,2014.

Autobiography of Dinu Hartwich. tonebird.org, 2014.

Biography of László Csupor Homepage of the School of Music of Kaposvár, 2014.

Records with the contribution of Dezső Lehota in the National Document-supplying System (Országos Dokumentumellátó Rendszer)
