= Jiří Neduha =

Czech musician and writer (born 1949)

- Born: February 4, 1949 (age 77); Prague
- Genres: Rock
- Occupations: Singer, writer

Jiří Neduha (born 4 February 1949 in Prague) is a Czech singer-songwriter and short story writer.

== Biography ==
He is the younger brother of musician and writer Jaroslav Jeroným Neduha.

As a result of Akce Asanace, he left Czechoslovakia for Canada in 1981. He began to write songs and formed his first band G-spot. He also worked with Vratislav Brabenec, another Czech immigrant living in Canada. He returned to Czechoslovakia in 1992, over two years after the Velvet Revolution. In 2001, along with guitarist Vladimír Galusek, he formed the band Zpocený voko.

He published his first short story collection Záloha na slávu in 2014. Two more books followed, Věčný trosečník in 2016 and Pan Olympan in 2020.
