= Akce Asanace =

1977–1984 secret police operation in Czechoslovakia

Akce Asanace (English: Sanitation Act) was the cover name for a Czechoslovak StB (secret police) operation in the late 1970s and early 1980s, with which the Communist regime tried to force inconvenient people, especially signatories of Charter 77, to leave the country. Various forms of psychological and physical coercion and blackmail were used, including forcing individuals to emigrate. Prominent individuals against whom this was used include Milan Hlavsa, Vratislav Brabenec, Vlastimil Třešňák, Jaroslav Jeroným Neduha, Jaroslav Hutka, Svatopluk Karásek, Václav Malý, Karol Sidon, Petr Cibulka, and Pavel Landovský.

== Origin and progression ==
On 21 December 1977, then-Minister of the Interior, Jaromír Obzina, issued an order to "achieve the complete disintegration and isolation of the main organizers of Charter 77 from other signatories, and the selected organizers of this event to be evicted from the Czechoslovak Republic". The StB focused especially on younger and lesser-known dissidents, because they were not so visible and their persecution did not provoke significant protest. Common methods of coercion were physical violence and blackmail. For those who agreed to emigrate, the StB ensured that all necessary formalities were completed without complications. Pressure peaked between 1980 and 1981, as the government was afraid the Charter 77 movement would join forces with Poland's nascent Solidarity.

In all, 280 signatories of Charter 77, i.e., about 15% of the total number, were forced to emigrate, including ten members of the Committee for the Defense of the Unjustly Prosecuted (VONS). The operation also swept up dissidents that had not signed the charter, such as Radko Pavlovec, a noted anti-fascist activist who had been imprisoned between 1952 and 1960 at the Jáchymov labor camp. Akce Asanace ended in 1984 and was followed by a similar operation, named Akce Klín.

== Aftermath and trials ==
In 1999, criminal trials of several politicians and members of the StB associated with Akce Asanace began and continue to this day. Jaromír Obzina escaped conviction, as he died in January 2003. Most of those convicted have received suspended sentences. In September 2021, courts recognized four additional StB employees who had persecuted Charter 77 signatories such as Vratislav Brabenec of The Plastic People of the Universe and Jaroslav Jeroným Neduha of Extempore, though their verdicts have not been finalized yet.

== Popular usage ==
The term "Asanace" has been used in contexts that refer to government persecution or prohibition, as in the case of Asanace2, a call for the Czech government to legalize the use and growing of cannabis products.
