= Naa Amanua =

Ghanaian folk musician (1948 1949 – 2024)

- Born: Mary Naa Amanua Dodoo; 1948 or 1949; Accra, Gold Coast (now Ghana)
- Died: 17 December 2024 (aged 75–76) Accra, Ghana
- Genres: Ghanaian folk music
- Occupations: Singer; songwriter
- Years active: 1973–2024
- Formerly of: Wulomei, Charlotte Dada, Suku Troupe

Mary Naa Amanua Dodoo (1948 or 1949 – 16 December 2024), better known as Naa Amanua, was a Ghanaian singer and songwriter of Ga folk music. She was the lead female singer of Wulomei, a Ghanaian music group that was founded in 1973. Amanua was the recipient of the 2018 Vodafone Ghana Music Awards Lifetime Achievement Honors.

== Background ==
Amanua was born in 1948 or 1949. Her parents were musicians. Her father was a guitarist and her mother was a dancer and singer. She joined the choir at St. Georges Garrison Anglican Church, Burma Camp, and later went to Abokobi Presbyterian Mixed-Middle School, where she became the lead singer in the school during the late 1960s. Amanua died on 17 December 2024.

== Career ==
Before becoming the first female singer to join the Wulomei Band, she worked as a City Guard for the Accra City Council, now the Accra Metropolitan Assembly.

Amanua later left Wulomei to join the Suku Troupe whose first album, awo de me, was a big hit. The Suku Troupe afforded Amanua the opportunity to give the world. In 1978, they toured Benin, Togo and Liberia in West Africa and visited Kenya, where they performed for President Jomo Kenyatta.

After a decade with Suku Troupe, Amanua left to form her own group in 1988 and released Mi yen Maya in 1989. She performed at events and special occasions and stole the show alongside the Burgher Highlife musician, Charles Amoah, at the 18th edition of the Vodafone Ghana Music Awards.

== Honour ==
In 2018, the Ga-Adangme Concern Youth Group under the leadership of Nii Ayaafio Tetteh recognized and awarded her the Ga title "Nye Kpakpa" for her contribution to Ga-Adangbe music from the grass roots. Amanua believed that a gift from God is everlasting.

In 2018, she received the Lifetime Achievement award at the Vodafone Ghana Music Awards.
