= Saka Acquaye =

Ghanaian artist, musician, playwright (1923–2007)

Saka Acquaye (2 November 1923 – 27 February 2007) was a Ghanaian musician, playwright, sculptor and textile designer.

== Early life ==
Saka Acquaye was born in Accra, Gold Coast (now Ghana), on 2 November 1923, the sixth child of his parents Regina and John Akweifio. He was educated in the Methodist School, Accra Royal School and then Government Boys Schools. He obtained a Cadbury Scholarship to enter Cadbury House, Achimota School. He washed dishes in the school's dining-hall so he could have extra food, since his parents could not afford to supplement his meals.

While at college he became a champion hurdler, training without shoes and using his own primitive hurdles made from tree branches. He became the captain of a squad of the National Athletic Team to represent the Gold Coast in 1950. He was Champion hurdler for the Gold Coast.

On completion of his course at Achimota, he taught for a couple of years at St. Augustine's College in Cape Coast, in the early 1950s.

== Career ==
Wanting to pursue further studies in the United States, but without funds, Acquaye started creating textile designs, which he sold to build his resources. At the time, he had founded the Black Beats Band, much to the displeasure of his father. He loved and played the saxophone, flute and mouth organ.

Acquaye's break finally came in 1953 and he left the shores of the Gold Coast to pursue further studies at Pennsylvania Academy of the Fine Arts.

He founded the African Ensemble while in the US and, as its leader, recorded an album under the ELEKTRA label. This group was made up of American musicians. He also put together a group known as the African Tones. On his return from his studies in the United States to settle in Ghana, he met Mavis Amua-Sekyi. Acting was one of her hobbies, and Saka Acquaye gave her one of the leading roles in Obadzeng, an opera he wrote. This drama piece so captivated Osagyefo Dr Kwame Nkrumah that he ordered a command performance and toured the Soviet Union with the play. Acquaye had many plays to his credit including a book, Problem of Creativity in Contemporary Africa, which he was hoping to launch. Saka Acquaye and Mavis married on 4 August 1962.

He returned with his family to the United States to pursue further studies at the University of California, Los Angeles (UCLA). The many friends he met there include Maya Angelou, who was his neighbour on Sunset Strip. Saka Acquaye returned to Ghana and back to his busy life after this period of study. He directed Wulomei, a cultural group, for nine years, touring Europe and the United States a couple of times and performing several times at the Arts Centre, among other venues. Today, the two big trees he planted in front of the Arts Centre in Accra are there as a reminder for us.

Acquaye exhibited his work at home, in Nigeria, at the Royal Academy in London, in the US and in Japan. Some of his works of art can be found in the Banking Hall of the Bank of Ghana; the reception of the US Embassy; Ghana Commercial Bank, Tema Gordon Guggisberg's Monument at Korle-Bu Hospital; busts of Guggisberg, Fraser and Achimota School; Dr J. B. Danquah Circle, Osu; inlaid panelling at Ghana Airways Offices in Cocoa House and in Lagos, Johnson Wax Conference Centre in Racine, Wisconsin, USA; the African American Heritage Association Lecture hall at Wayne University, Detroit, USA, and Cambridge University, among others.

== Awards ==
As a student in Philadelphia, received awards that include:

- The Stivinson Award - 1954
- Honorable Mention Portnoff Award - 1955
- Lila Agness Kennedy Hill award - 1955
- Stewardson Honorable Mention - 1955
- Steward Award - 1956
- Cresson European Traveling Scholarship - 1956
- Eisenhower Leadership - 1956
- Ware Leadership - 1958

His local honours include a CSIR Gold Award 1979; Leisure Award-1988; ECRAG Flagstar Award 1993.
