= Bruno Pochesci =

Italian-French musician and writer (1970–2024)

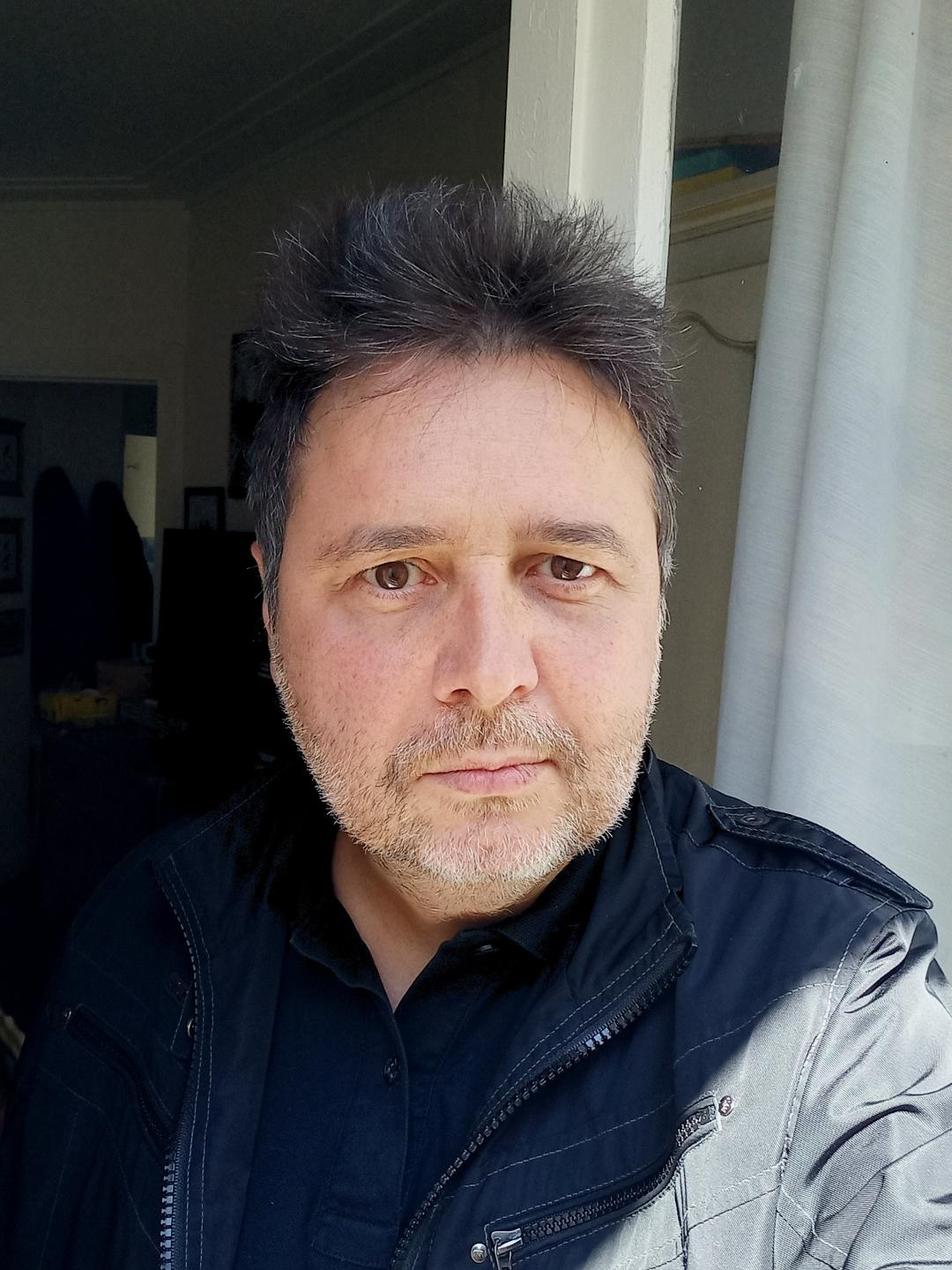
- Pochesci in 2023
- Born: 3 February 1970; Civitavecchia, Italy
- Died: 9 October 2024 (aged 54)
- Occupations: Musician; Writer

Bruno Pochesci (3 February 1970 – 9 October 2024) was an Italian-French musician and writer. He also worked as a singer-songwriter under the pseudonym Sirieix and often collaborated with Jean-Pierre Andrevon.

A specialist in science fiction and fantasy, he received the Prix Masterton in the "short story" category for L'Amour, la Mort et le Reste, published with Éditions Malpertuis and was co-laureate of the Prix Bob-Morane in 2020 for L'Espace, le Temps et Au-delà.

== Biography ==
Born in Civitavecchia on 3 February 1970, Pochesci's military father led the family to move between Turin, Venice, and Milan. A self-taught musician, he joined the band Trois Fois Rien, which released the albums Bleu blanc rage (2005) and S'agiter avant usage (2010). He moved to Paris in 2003 and became acquainted with Jean-Pierre Andrevon, with whom he worked as an arranger, a producer, and a composer. He also worked with Franca Maï until her death.

Pochesci published his first novel, Hammour, in 2016, followed by Scories in 2019. He also published his first science fiction novel in 2019, titled L'espace, le temps et au-delà.

Pochesci died on 9 October 2024, at the age of 54.

== Works ==
- Hammour (2016)
- Scories (2019)
- L'Amour, la mort et le reste (2019)
- L'Espace, le temps et au-delà (2019)
- De la chair à horloge (2020)
- Des lendemains qui shuntent (2022)
- Réseaux sociaux et numériques dans le futur (2023)
- Ce qu'il advint du Reich de mille ans (2024)
