= Jacques Barsamian =

French singer, writer, and journalist (1943–2024)

- Born: 17 March 1943; Nice, Italian-occupied France
- Died: 1 December 2024 (aged 81); Paris, France
- Occupations: Singer, writer, journalist

Jacques Barsamian (17 March 1943 – 1 December 2024) was a French singer, writer, and journalist who specialised in rock music. He collaborated with the likes of Rock & Folk, Europe 1, France Inter, and RMC. He also authored a series of works on rock and popular music alongside François Jouffa. Barsamian died on 1 December 2024, at the age of 81.

== Works with François Jouffa ==
- Johnny Story (1975)
- Stones Story (1976)
- Elvis Presley Story (1977)
- Idoles Story (Yéyé Story) (1978)
- L’Âge d’or du rock ’n’ roll (1980)
- L’Âge d’or de la pop music (1982)
- L’Âge d’or du yéyé (1983)
- L’Âge d’or du rock & folk (1985)
- L’Âge d’or de la rock music (1986)
- L’Aventure du rock (1989)
- Johnny, 50 ans (1992)
- L’Encyclopédie de la black music (1994)
- L’Encyclopédie du rock américain (1996)
- Johnny 60 ans (2002)
- Les Stones 40 ans de rock & roll (2003)
- Histoire du rock (2005)
- Génération Johnny (2010)
