= George Nicolescu =

Romanian blind musician (1950–2024)

George Nicolescu (Romanian pronunciation: [ˈdʒe̯ordʒe nikoˈlesku]; 12 March 1950, Ploiești – 26 March 2024, Bucharest) was a Romanian musician.

== Life and career ==
Born in Ploieşti, Nicolescu has four sisters. He attended the Bucharest School for Amblyopia Patients (1957–1959), middle school and high school (1960–1968) and the School for the Blind in Cluj (1968–1972). Self-taught, he made his singing debut in Cluj and in 1970 won first prize at the Tinereţe pe portativ ("Youth on the Scale") festival. A few years later, the composer George Grigoriu began to influence him, and the two began collaborating. In 1973, his first hit, "Eternitate" ("Eternity"), was released, and the following year came four hits released on a 45, under Grigoriu's name.

In 1972 he gained admission to the University of Bucharest's Faculty of Romance Languages, French-Romanian section. He graduated in 1976 and the following April began teaching French at the School for the Blind in Buzău, where he remained until 1985. That year, he was hired as a vocal soloist at the Buzău Youth House. After the Romanian Revolution of 1989, he was engaged for several months (March–November 1990) as a soloist with the ensemble "Optimiştii", a troupe of blind performers.

Nicolescu retired in 1992, taking part in various shows and singing in restaurants in order to earn a living. In autumn 2002, ten years after retiring, Nicolescu returned to the top of the Romanian charts through a duet with the band UNU'. The hit single was called "Cântec pentru sănătatea ierbii" ("Song for the Grass's Health"). He also performed "Îndrăgostit" ("In Love") with the young singer Jorge. In December 2007, he released the album Muzică uşoară...lăutărească ("Light Music, Lăutar-style"), featuring songs by other musicians of his age such as Dan Spătaru, Mirabela Dauer, Gabriel Dorobanţu and Corina Chiriac.

Nicolescu died on 26 March 2024, at the age of 74.

== Discography ==
- Şi cântau mandolinele (1974)
- Ordinea de zi (1984)
- Prefă-te inimă în stea (1989)
- Muzică uşoara...lăutărească (2007)
- Unu feat. George Nicolescu - Mai avem nevoie si de iarba ( 2007 )
- Shift feat. George Nicolescu - Viata-i de vina (2012)
