= Cool It Reba =

American band

Cool It Reba was an American band from New York City, that was part of the downtown post-punk and no wave scene in the early 1980s. Their music combined elements of James Brown funk, Television's guitar interplay and David Byrne's lyrical paranoia to a danceable beat.

The name came from a catch phrase that Soupy Sales often said on his show.

The band was formed in the autumn of 1981 by vocalist and guitarist David Hansen, who was previously a member of Rhode Island's The Young Adults, and drummer Kevin Tooley who was in The Mundanes. The original line-up was completed by John Fredericks on lead guitar and bassist Baker Rorick (who later played in The Baxters, The Scarecrows and Purple K'niF).

They regularly played such venues as CBGB's, The Peppermint Lounge, The Mudd Club and Danceteria NYC. After only their fourth gig they signed to Hannibal Records in 1982. Shortly thereafter, they released the Joe Boyd-produced Money Fall Out The Sky EP. Containing such songs as "I Saw Snakes", "Out Where The Buses Don't Run" and the title track, it was met with critical acclaim, making many critics' annual top-ten lists.

The band then played alongside the likes of Billy Idol, John Cale and R.E.M. Label restaffing and losing key members led to the ultimate breakup of the band in the summer of 1984, although half of the band members later played together in the band Steve McQueen. Although Cool It Reba only released one record during their existence, many bootlegs of their live shows and unreleased studio recordings have circulated.

== Discography ==
- Money Fall Out The Sky, 1982, Hannibal Records

== Original members ==
- David Hansen (lead vocals, rhythm guitar)
- John Fredericks (lead guitar, vocals)
- Baker Rorick (bass)
- Kevin Tooley (drums, percussion)

== Later members ==
- Gordon Wands (bass 1983–84)
- John McCurry (lead guitar 1983)
- Sid McGinnis (lead guitar 1983)
- Jack Rigg (lead guitar 1984)
- Sturgis Nikides (lead guitar 1984)
