= Rajko Maksimović =

Serbian composer (1935–2024)

Rajko Maksimović (Serbian Cyrillic: Рајкo Максимовић; 27 July 1935 – 16 August 2024) was a Serbian composer, writer, and music pedagogue.

== Biography ==
Rajko Maksimović was born on 27 July 1935 in Belgrade, Serbia. He graduated in 1961, and in 1965 received a master's degree in composition from the Music Academy in Belgrade (today Faculty of Music, University of Arts in Belgrade (FMU)) in the class of Professor Predrag Milošević. Following the completion of his master's program and as a recipient of a Fulbright grant, he attended Princeton University, with a main focus on electronic music.

In 1963, Maksimović was appointed an assistant professor, and in 1967 a docent at the Department for Composition and Orchestration at the Belgrade Music Academy. He retired in 2001 as Professor of Music Composition. Three monographic concerts devoted exclusively to his oeuvre took place during his career, and most of his works have been recorded. Among the recordings, a particular emphasis belongs to a triple CD from 2002, two CDs from 2009, and The Saint Prince Lazarus Passion DVD from 2012—all on the PGP RTS label (Radio Television of Serbia record label). In 1995, Radio Television Novi Sad produced a fifty-minute program about this composer and his work. Maksimović also authored a memoirist autobiographical trilogy entitled That's the Way It Was ((Tako je to bilo), 1998, 2001, and 2002).

Maksimović died in Belgrade on 16 August 2024, at the age of 89.

== Works ==
Maksimović composed numerous vocal-instrumental, orchestral, chamber, choral, and soloist works, as well as pieces devoted to children. Among his most significant compositions are: vocal-instrumental When the Living Envied the Dead (1963), an epic partita for mixed choir and reduced orchestra, Three Haiku (1967) for female choir and twenty-four instruments, The Uprising against the Dahias (1978/2004), a dramatic oratorio for two actors, mixed and children's choirs, orchestra, and tape, The Testament of Petar Petrović Njegoš, Bishop of Montenegro (1986) for bass, choir, orchestra, and tape, and The Saint Prince Lazarus Passion (1989) for narrator, four vocal soloists, two choirs, and orchestra; orchestral Piano Concerto (1961/2003), Musique de Devenir (1965), and Diptych for orchestra (1970); chamber pieces After the Scent of a Blossomed Cherry (1981) five haiku for soprano and chamber ensemble, Prélude "á l'avant-midi d'un faune" (1994/2011) for flute and strings, and She Sleeps Perhaps (1992/2005), a soloist cantata for mezzo-soprano and chamber orchestra; choral Chants out of the Darkness (1975), a book of six madrigals for various a cappella choirs, and I Go calmly (from the Testament, 1986), Funeral (from the Passion, 1989), Our Father (from Temptation, 1994), and We Praise Thee, O God (2008), all for mixed a cappella choir.

Maksimović's pieces for children include: A Baby-Elephant (1972) for baritone, children's choir, and ensemble, Stars (1973) for mezzo-soprano, female octet, and ensemble, and Itchy Hills (A Stinging Nettle, 1980/2008), music play for children.

=== Writings ===
Beside his three-volume autobiography, Maksimović also authored a study More on Modes ((Šire o modusima) Serbian and English version, 1995), and books Basics of Notation ((Osnovi notnog pisma), textbook, 1999), The Speech of Music (in collaboration with Miloš Jevtić in the form of questions and answers, 2008), Travels through North America (2008), and The Second Travel through North America (2009).

=== Musical language ===
During his studies at the Belgrade Music Academy and in accordance with the Department of Composition and Orchestration curriculum requirements, Maksimović composed works of a prevalent neoclassical provenance. Following his graduation, he became involved with the concepts of the so-called Polish Composers' School (New Polish School). During this period, the works of Witold Lutosławski, specifically compositions based on principles of Aleatory and the use of clusters, became particularly attractive for Maksimović. After acquiring the compositional techniques of Polish composers' and applying them in his own works, in 1975 Maksimović shifted his musical language and turned to inspiration found in (Serbian) tradition, ‘returning' to modal idiom and simplicity, with occasionally heightened language by the use of clusters. This stylistic orientation has remained predominant in Maksimović's work until today.

Maksimović composed Musique de Devenir (1965) for his master's degree at the Belgrade Music Academy (Peričić 1969, 239). This work could be considered a “true aleatoric writing based on the principles of the Polish School” (Veselinović-Hofman 1983, 360). With an intention to present a gradual formation of a musical idea, Maksimović based this work on a B-A-C-H motive, progressively expanded to a twelve-tone collection. The rhythmic structure of Musique de Devenir is aleatoric, while its pitch designations are fixed.

Inspired by Japanese poetry, in the Three Haiku, commissioned by the 1967 Music Biennale Zagreb, Maksimović ‘paints' a distant, faraway Japanese scenery. In distinction to Musique de Devenir, only partially subjected to the aleatoric principle (Peričić 1969, 242), the Three Haiku is entirely dominated by this principle. The particular instrumental timbre, and a specific treatment of the women's choir often featuring voice movements at intervallic distances of seconds and abound in imprecisely notated whisper and parlando, served the composer for invoking the ‘sound of Japan.' This work is also characterized by clusters built by aleatoric stratification of instruments that renders unique chordal ‘coloration.'

Maksimović composed the book of six madrigals Chants out of the Darkness (1975) for a cappella choir upon literary texts by mostly anonymous medieval authors. The six independent and rather diverse compositions, conceived from 1973-75 primarily evoke forms of Italian madrigals, thus are often interpreted as the composer's return to tradition. Among the main features of this work are: modal centricity and word painting as representative of madrigals, the linear notion of the melodic line, and focusing on the denotative dimension of the text, with occasional dissonances, cluster textures, and “frictions within the vertical (constellations)” (Veselinović-Hofman 1997, 63).

The Saint Prince Lazarus Passion completed in 1989 and conferred the October Award of Belgrade, represents the most comprehensive and most significant work of Maksimović, not only within the vocal-instrumental genre, but within his entire oeuvre. The following is a description of the Passion in the composer's words: “I envisaged the Passion—and realized it, I believe—as a drama, that is, as action. I imagine the future listener of the Passion as a pilgrim who comes to Kosovo field where he encounters the Kosovo Pillar. The pilgrim reads an Inscription, whereas the Pillar in fact narrates the inscription thus introducing the pilgrim to the plot. Lazar of Serbia speaks at that very moment. The visitor turns around looking at Kosovo field filled with ‘the bones of the dead in great multitude' and thus the story commences (‘Prologue'). At first, the scene represents a peaceful prosperity, happiness, and beauty (Ravanica Monastery), but it is shortly followed by ‘Forebodings' (a solar eclipse and the falling star) anticipating a number of calamities and disasters (earthquake, hunger, plague, and raids). The first real catastrophe takes place in 1371, when ‘the wrath of the Lord came upon Serbs' allowing their bloody slaughter in the Battle of Maritsa. Consequently, after the battle, Lazar's Serbia gets a very evil neighbor, one who assaults our territory, largely raiding, murdering, brutalizing, and imprisoning (‘Menace'). Realizing that the day of the ultimate combat has approached, Prince Lazar at first addresses God for help (‘Prayer'), then summons his noblemen, dukes, and other warriors, and through his solemn and inspiring patriotic ‘Sermon' invites them to a brave and proud death, to a conscious but dignified sacrifice into the heavenly kingdom in the name of a superior morality, humanity, and justice. At that moment, the Prince identifies himself with his people (and as it will be seen, the people identify with the Prince) and the Sermon is sung together by Lazar and the chorus. Following the Sermon, the ‘Warriors take Oath' to their Prince and before all stands the bravest among them, the future hero and national legend—Miloš. The combative and patriotic pledges follow one another, sublimed at the end by the shortest one (‘Let us die to live in eternity') delivered in fugato and representing the appeal and command for the strike. The two choruses take part in the ‘Battle' in a manner of exchanging the sound and rapid eighth notes' motion between choruses (from left to right), creating I believe, for a part of the audience (at particular seating locations, depending on the performance space) an impression of being amidst the very battle! After three grandiose ‘waves,' the music stops culminating in a sudden absence of sound whereas the Narrator announces Lazar's tragic fate—all his men were slain including Lazar himself! In a somewhat longer speech that follows, (intended to provide relief from ‘the clashing of arms and the cries of horses and men') the Narrator takes us to the Prince's ‘Funeral.' In an ecstatic ‘Lament,' Princess Milica parts with her husband, and the priests surrounded by gathered people sing the final funeral chorale. After hearing, seeing, and experiencing the entire story, our pilgrim (the Passion's sole witness) slowly departs while the singing of the funeral procession grows quieter. The Pillar sees him away with the very same words from the Prologue, but here, in the Epilogue, with the trice added warning: ‘Thou shall not pass by... and take no notice!' that is, ‘you will not forget.'”

== List of significant works ==
Choral and vocal-instrumental:

- When the Living Envied the Dead (Kad su živi zavideli mrtvima) (1963), an epic partita for mixed choir and reduced orchestra (version in English language, 2008)
- Three Haiku (1967), for female choir and twenty-four instruments
- Chants out of the Darkness (Iz tmine pojanje) (1975), a book of six madrigals
- The Uprising against the Dahias (Buna protiv dahija) (1978, revised 2004), a dramatic oratorio for two actors, mixed and children's choirs, orchestra, and tape
- Palabras en Piedra (Reči u kamenu; Words in Stone) (1980), for mixed choir
- Prometheus (1985), for mixed choir
- The Testament of Petar Petrović Njegoš, Bishop of Montenegro (Testament vladike crnogorskog Petra Petrovića Njegoša) (1986), for bass, mixed choir, orchestra, and tape (version in English, 2007)
- I Go calmly (Ja na Tvoj poziv) (from the Testament, 1986), for mixed choir (version in English, 2007)
- The Saint Prince Lazarus Passion (Pasija svetoga kneza Lazara) (1989), for narrator, four vocal soloists, two choirs, and orchestra (version in English, 2008)
- Funeral (Sahrana) (from the Passion, 1989), for mixed choir (version in English, 2008)
- Fate [Sudba] (1993), for mixed choir
- Temptation, Feat, and Death of Saint Peter of Korisha (Iskušenje, podvig i smrt Sv. Petra Koriškog) (1994), for narrator, three soloists, mixed choir, orchestra, and tape
- Our Father (Otče naš) (from Temptation, 1994), for mixed choir (version in Latin (Pater noster), 2001)
- This and That (Ovo i ono) (1995), for mixed choir
- Colored (1996), for mixed choir and double bass
- O-TRIM-PARA (2004), for mixed choir
- Psalm 90 (2005), for mixed and children choirs, flute, trumpet, and horn
- Hohes Lied (Pesma nad pesmama; The Song of Songs) (2007), for mixed choir
- We Praise Thee, O God (Tebe Boga hvalim) (2008), for mixed choir

Orchestral:

- Piano Concerto (1961, revised 2003)
- Musique de Devenir (Muzika postajanja) (1965)
- Diptych for Orchestra (Not to be or to be? a dilemma for orchestra, 1969 and Eppur si muove, 1970)
- Suite for Orchestra (2009), four reworked movements from The Saint Prince Lazarus Passion

Chamber:

- Partita Concertante (1965), for violin and thirteen strings
- Two Basho's Haiku (1966), for voice, flute, violin, piano, and tape
- Trialogue (1968), for clarinet, string trio, and piano
- Jeu á Quatre (1977), for two pianos in eight hands
- Concerto non Grosso (1978), for school strings
- Tenderly? (1979), for chamber ensemble
- After the Scent of a Blossomed Cherry (Za mirisom rascvetale trešnje) (1981), five haiku for soprano and chamber ensemble
- Ave Maria (1985/2004), for choir, flute, piano, and strings
- She Sleeps Perhaps (Možda spava) (1992/2005), a soloist cantata for mezzo-soprano and chamber orchestra (or for mezzo-soprano, flute, and piano; version in English, 2006)
- Prélude "á l'avant-midi d'un faune" (Prelid za pre podne jednog fauna) (1994/2011), for flute and strings (or for flute, violin, and piano)
- Les Proverbes de Fénis (Poslovice iz Fenisa) (1995/2010), for four voices and ensemble of ancient instruments
- The Garland (Rukovet) (2003/2009), for flute, violin, and strings (or for flute, violin, and piano)
- Jeu á deux (Igra udvoje) (2006), for piano duo
- Suite from Passion (2009), for violin and strings

Solo:

- Gambit (1993), for piano

Music for Children:

- A Baby-elephant (Slonče 1972) for baritone, children's choir, and ensemble
- Uncle's bugging me (Gnjavi me teča) (1972), for (child) soprano, children's choir, and ensemble
- I was Told (Rekoše mi) (1972), for baritone, children's choir, and ensemble
- Stars (Zvezde) (1973), for mezzo-soprano, female octet, and ensemble
- If There Were No Stars (Da nije zvezda) (1973), for mezzo-soprano, female octet, and ensemble
- The Three Floor Patient (Bolesnik na tri sprata) (1973), for two-part children's choir and piano
- Pretty Kata (Lepa Kata) (1974), for voice and piano
- The Blue Ant (Plavi mrav) (1974), for voice and piano
- Itchy Hills (A Stinging Nettle) (Svrbeća brda, Koprive) (1980/2008), music play for children
- A l'école des animaux (2009), for two-part children's choir, flute, and piano

=== Selected recordings ===
- When the Living Envied the Dead (Kad su živi zavideli mrtvima), The Uprising against the Dahias (Buna protiv dahija), Orchestral and Chamber music (1965–77), and The Saint Prince Lazarus Passion (Pasija Svetoga kneza Lazara). PGP RTS, 3 CDs, 341388.
- The Testament and Vocal Music. PGP RTS, CD 431951.
- Temptation, Feat, and Death of Saint Peter of Korisha (Iskušenje, podvig i smrt Sv. Petra Koriškog) and Chants out of the Darkness (Iz tmine pojanje). PGP RTS, CD 432095.
- The Saint Prince Lazarus Passion (Pasija Svetoga kneza Lazara), PGP RTS, DVD 491733

== Bibliography ==
- Bergamo, Marija. 1980. The Elements of expressionistic orientation in Serbian music (Elementi ekspresionističke orijentacije u srpskoj muzici). Belgrade: University of Arts.
- Marinković, Sonja. 2009. A History of Serbian music, Belgrade: Zavod za udžbenike.
- Mikić, Vesna. 2007. „The Neoclassical tendencies” (Neoklasične tendencije). In A History of Serbian music. Belgrade: Zavod za udžbenike.
- Peričić, Vlastimir. 1969. Composers in Serbia (Muzički stvaraoci u Srbiji). Belgrade: Prosveta.
- Stojanović-Novičić, Dragana and Marija Masnikosa. 2007. “Orchestral music.” In: A History of Serbian music. Belgrade: Zavod za udžbenike.
- Rajko Maksimović - personal web site
