= Oldřich Janota =

Czech musician (1949–2024)

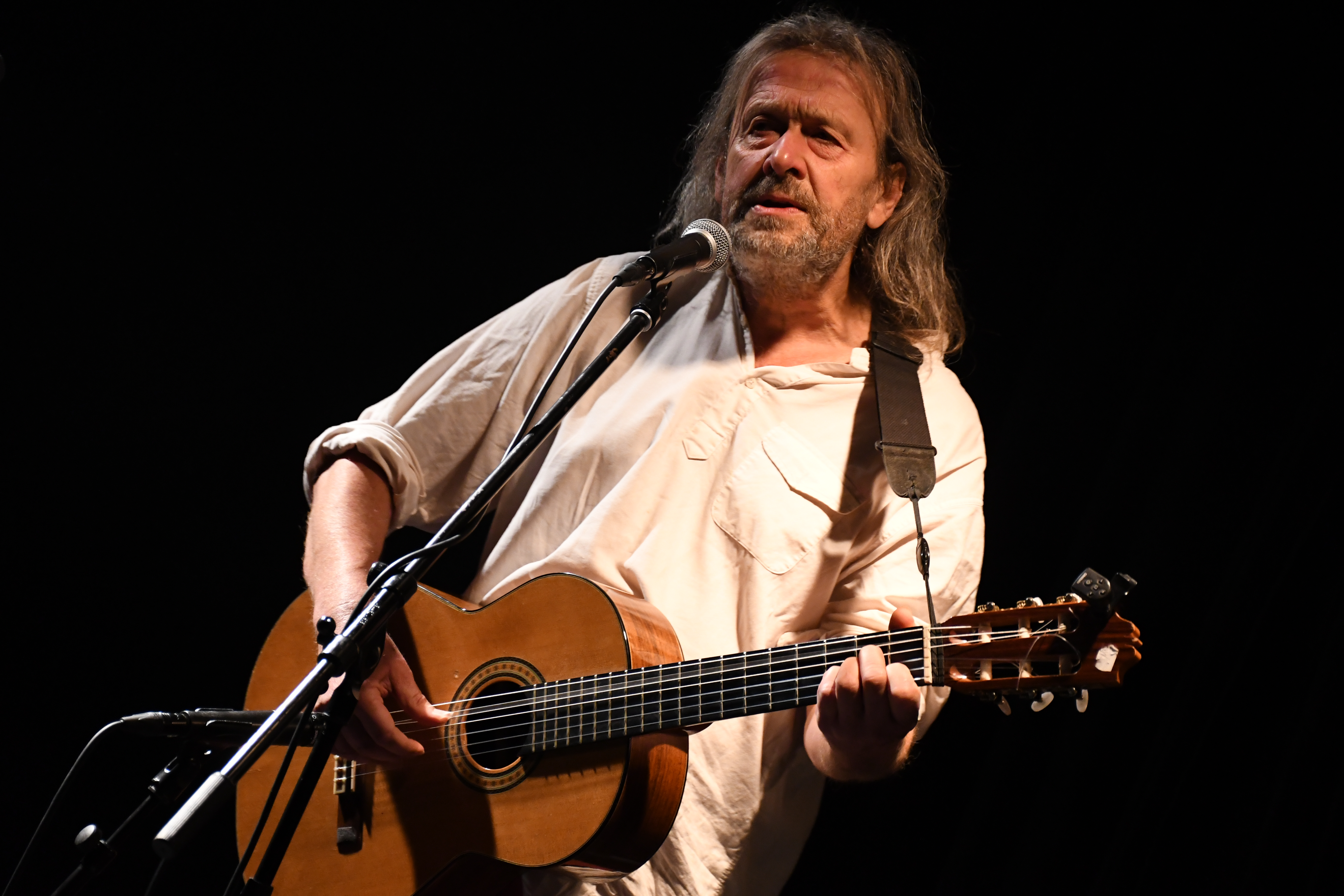
- Janota in 2018

Background information
- Born: 27 August 1949; Plzeň, Czechoslovakia
- Died: 27 July 2024 (aged 74) Czech Republic
- Genres: Folk
- Occupation: Singer-songwriter
- Instrument: Guitar
- Years active: 1970s–2024
- Label: Indies Scope
- Website: www.oldrichjanota.com

Oldřich Janota (27 August 1949 – 27 July 2024) was a Czech singer-songwriter. He is known for incorporating minimalist and experimental techniques into folk music, as well as working with pre-recorded tapes.

== Biography ==
Janota was born in Plzeň and studied journalism at Charles University in Prague, graduating in 1975. That same year he started playing with Jakub Noha. Together with some other musicians, they founded the band Pentagram in 1977. He was a member of Mozart K along with guitarist and sitarist Emil Pospíšil and saxophonist Jan Štolba between 1978 and 1983.

His collected lyrics were published in the book Kytaru s palmou in 2015. An 8-CD box set of his songs from the 1970s to the present was released in 2016, titled Ultimate Nothing.

In 2009, a 17-track tribute album Ztracený ve světě: A Tribute to Oldřich Janota was released to mark his 60th birthday.

Janota died on 27 July 2024, at the age of 74.

== Discography ==
- Winter Days (1989)
- Oldřich Janota (1990, later reissued as Mezi vlnami)
- Neviditelné věci (1990)
- Jiná rychlost času (1993)
- Žlutě (1994)
- Sešité (1996)
- Podzimní král (2000)
- High Fidelity (2001)
- Jako měsíc (2003)
- Ora pro nobis (2009)
- Posvěcení nového měsíce (2011)
- Kojoko (2014)
- Ultimate Nothing (2016)
- Vzpomínáš, Méďo? (2022)
- Zatlankou (2022)
- Rumové rachejtle (2024)
- Sladká holka z venkova (2024)
- Mariánský tanec (2024)
- Aforismy (2025)
