= Jordi Bonell =

Spanish guitarist (1958–2024)

Jordi Bonell i Dayá (3 March 1958 – 18 November 2024) was a Spanish guitarist and composer.

== Life and career ==
Bonell studied at Liceo's Conservatory in Barcelona and perfected his musical knowledge at the New School for Social Research in New York, where he had as teachers Jim Hall, John Abercrombie, Reggie Workman, among others.

In the studio he has recorded with artists such as Lola Flores, JM Serrat, The Suprems, Ricky Martín, Juan Gabriel, Michel Legrand, Gato Perez and Miguel Bosé.

He was member of the Bocanegra group, founded by Víctor Obiols and Pepe Sales, and he recorded his own music with the Azúcar Imaginario project.

As a teacher, he has taught in schools including the first Barcelona's jazz school, Escuela del Barrio de la Rivera.

Bonell died on 18 November 2024, at the age of 66.

== Discography ==
- Azúcar Imaginario (Origen, 1988)
- Àngel (Discmedi Blau, 1998)
- Corda brava (2002)
- Agua madre (World Village, 2004)
- Duo (Jordi Bonell & Dani Pérez) (New Mood Jazz, 2004)
- Al Volver Nunca Se Vuelve (Italo Boggio Trio & Jordi Bonell) (New Mood Jazz, 2005)
- Jazz a l'Estudi (Carles Benavent & Jordi Bonell with Roger Blàvia) (2011)
- Live in my land (Albert Marquès Trio & Jordi Bonell) (2016)
- Gemini (Jordi Gaspar, Jordi Bonell, Roger Blàvia) (Discmedi, 2016)
- Coral pulse (Temps Record, 2016)
- Musica Cordis (Jordi Bonell & Jordi Farrés) (MoojalRecords, 2024)
