= Władysław Słowiński =

Polish composer and conductor

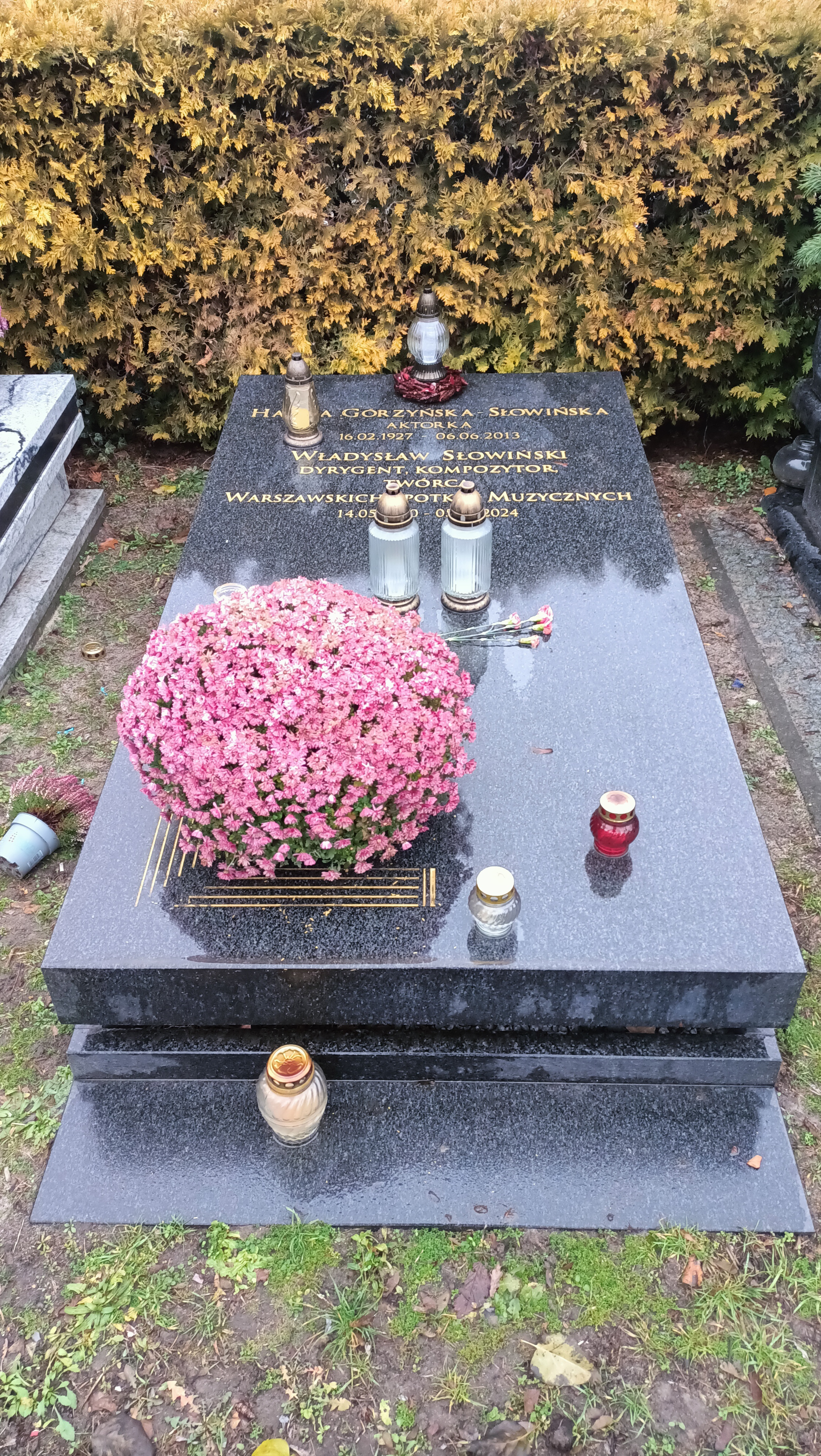
The grave of Hanna Górzyńska-Słowińska and Władysław Słowiński at the Powązki Military Cemetery.

Władysław Słowiński (14 May 1930 – 5 September 2024) was a Polish composer and conductor.

He studied composition under Tadeusz Szeligowski from 1950 to 1954 and conducting from 1951 to 1955 under Valerian Beerdiaeva and Stanisław Wisłocki at the State Higher School of Music in Poznań, as well as musicology with Adolf Chybiński at the University of A. Mickiewicz in Poznan.

From 1954 to 1964, he was the conductor of the Grand Theatre in Poznań, at the same time he collaborated with symphony orchestras, mainly with the Poznań Philharmonic, and in the following years with the Grand Theatre in Łódź, the Musical Theatre and the Grand Theatre in Warsaw.

From 1970 to 1973, he was the artistic director of Polish Recordings, in the years 1973–1985 he was secretary general of the Main Board of the Polish Composers' Union, and in the years 1985–2001 he was the president of the Warsaw branch of the Polish Composers Union. In 1986, he initiated the Warsaw Music Meetings festival, he was also its artistic director. He was a member of the Polish United Workers' Party.

Słowiński died on 5 September 2024, at the age of 94.
