= Low Society =

American blues rock band

- Origin: Memphis, Tennessee, U.S.
- Genres: Blues rock
- Years active: 2009–2024
- Labels: Rezonate Records, Icehouse Records
- Past members: Sturgis Nikides; Mandy Lemons; Nick Dodson; Mike Munn; Jacky Verstraeten; Bart De Bruecker

Low Society was an American blues rock band formed in 2009 by guitarist Sturgis Nikides and singer Mandy Lemons, who were the only permanent members throughout the band's career. Other members include Nick Dodson, Mike Munn, Jacky Verstraeten and Bart De Bruecker.

== Background ==
Based in Memphis, Tennessee, Low Society also extensively toured Europe, playing in Netherlands, Belgium, Germany, Switzerland, Luxembourg and the Czech Republic.

They released their debut studio album, High Time, in 2011 on Rezonate Records, followed by Can’t Keep a Good Woman Down in 2014 on Icehouse Records. This album features Dr. Herman Green on saxophone. Their third album, Sanctified, was released in 2017.

== Discography ==
- High Time (2011)
- Can’t Keep a Good Woman Down (2014)
- Sanctified (2017)
