= Bert De Coninck =

Belgian singer (1949–2024)

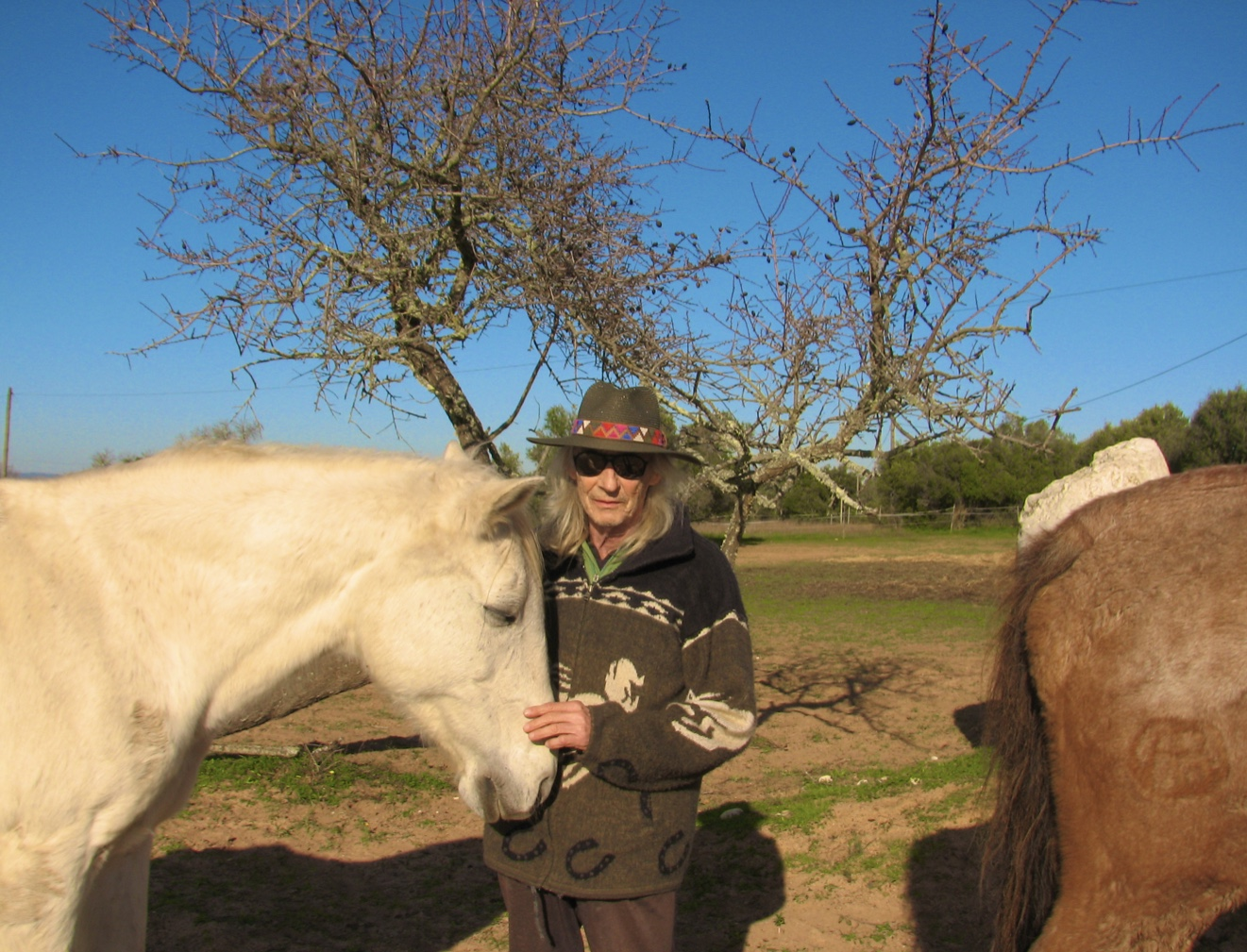
- De Coninck in 2020

Background information
- Born: Hubert Frans Joanna De Coninck; 23 June 1949; Mechelen, Belgium
- Died: 29 November 2024 (aged 75) Lagos, Portugal
- Occupations: Singer; guitarist; poet

Hubert Frans Joanna "Bert" De Coninck (23 June 1949 – 29 November 2024) was a Belgian singer and guitarist. The Flemish singer was a pioneer of Dutch-language rock and Belpop. His greatest successes were during the 1970s and 1980s. He was also a poet. His best-known song is Evelyne.

De Coninck died in Lagos, Portugal on 29 November 2024, at the age of 75.

== Discography ==
- Bert De Coninck − Evelyne / De Speelgoedpop (Parsifal) 7’’ single
- Bert De Coninck − Blijf nog even hier bij mij / Anderhalve Onsje Wiet (Parsifal) 7’’ single
- Bert De Coninck − Cadillac / De Katvis (Parsifal) 7’’ single
- Bert De Coninck & Fran − Johnny / Marilou-Marilyn (Parsifal) 7’’ single
- Bert De Coninck & Fran − Evelyne / Johnny (KDX) CD-single
- Crapule De Luxe − Rooms for travellers / Suck it to me − 7’’ single
- Bert De Coninck & Jean Rousseau − Enfant Terrible (Parsifal) LP/MC
- Bert De Coninck & Fran − Crapule de luxe (Parsifal) − LP
- Bert De Coninck − Pomme d'amour (Parsifal) − CD
- Bert De Coninck − La Salsichafobia de Marzapane (Ballon Media) − CD
