= Aminollah Rashidi =

Iranian singer and composer (1925–2024)

- امین‌الله رشیدی
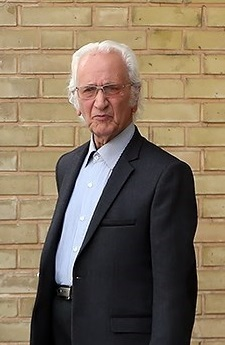
- Rashidi in 2017
- Born: 24 April 1925; Ravand, Isfahan province, Persia
- Died: 11 October 2024 (aged 99)

Aminollah Rashidi (24 April 1925 – 11 October 2024) was an Iranian singer and composer. By 2023, he was "the last surviving crooner from the country's pioneering era of the 1950s and 1960s."

== Biography ==
Rashidi was born in Ravand, Isfahan province on 24 April 1925. In 1946, he moved from Kashan to Tehran to be trained by Mousa Maroufi at Roudaki Hall and Mehdi Forough at the Tehran Conservatory of Music.

Rashidi worked for Radio Iran and wrote over 120 songs in 1948–1956. He performed at the Andisheh Hall in 2018. By 2023, he was "the last surviving crooner from the country's pioneering era of the 1950s and 1960s."

Rashidi died on 11 October 2024, at the age of 99.
