= Teresa Bright =

American musician (1959/1960–2024)

- Born: 1959 or 1960
- Origin: Honolulu, Hawaii, U.S.
- Died: September 1, 2024 (aged 64)
- Genres: Hawaiian Music
- Occupation: Musician
- Instrument(s): Ukulele, guitar, vocals

Teresa Bright (1959 or 1960 – September 1, 2024) was an American vocalist and musician of native Hawaiian music who played ukulele and guitar. Her music is popular in Japan as well as in Hawaii and the United States mainland. Much of her repertoire features lyrics in the Hawaiian Language, but she had an extensive jazz and hapa-haole repertoire as well.

== Biography ==
Bright attended the University of Hawaiʻi and launched her music career in the 1980s as one half of "Steve and Teresa" alongside Steve Mai`i. Her first solo album was released in 1990.

She received a lifetime achievement award from Hawaiʻi Academy of Recording Arts on December 6, 2020.

Bright died on September 1, 2024, at the age of 64.

== Japan ==
Bright was popular in Japan, and some of her albums are not released outside of the country. Besides album sales, Bright also participated in Japanese advertising campaigns for Max Factor, Toyota, NTT Japan, Sapporo Beer, and Japan Airlines.

== Okinawa ==
Her 2007 album, Hawaiinawa, features popular Okinawan songs with lyrics translated into the Hawaiian Language.

== Awards ==
- 2009 – Na Hoku Hanohano Award
- 1991 – Na Hoku Hanohano Award
- 1988 – Na Hoku Hanohano Award (shared with Steve Mai`i)

== Discography ==
- 1981 Catching a Wave
- 1983 Ocean Blue
- 1986 Intimately
- 1990 Self Portrait
- 1994 Painted Tradition
- 1995 A Bright Hawaiian Christmas
- 1996 Kapilina and Quiet Girl
- 1997 Quiet Nights
- 1998 Crossing the Blue
- 2000 A Christmas Season’s Delight
- 2002 Lei Ana
- 2004 A Gallery
- 2006 Pretty Eyes
- 2007 Hawaiinawa
- 2008 Tropic Rhapsody
