= Sturgis Nikides =

- Born: March 9, 1958; New York City, New York, U.S.
- Died: April 9, 2024 (aged 66); Memphis, Tennessee, U.S.
- Genres: Rock
- Occupation: Musician
- Instrument: Guitar
- Years active: 1970s–2024
- Member of: Low Society
- Formerly of: John Cale band
- Spouse: Mandy Lemons

Sturgis Nikides (March 9, 1958 – April 9, 2024) was an American guitarist.

== Biography ==
Sturgis Nikides was born in Brooklyn, moved to New Jersey when he was eight, and later to Staten Island.

Nikides started playing guitar in 1965, inspired by seeing The Beatles at Shea Stadium. He formed his first band in 1969 and was a member of several bands during the 1970s, including the Neon Leon band. He joined John Cale's band in 1979, playing on the studio version of "Mercenaries (Ready for War)" single (1980) and on Honi Soit (1981). He also played with Cool It Reba. He left New York for Miami in 1989 and played with Diane Ward in Voidville. The band disbanded in 1993. He then devoted himself to producing recordings for other artists and composing instrumental music for film and television.

In 2004, Nikides released his first solo album Man of Steel.

In 2009, he participated in the documentary Who Killed Nancy? He formed Low Society in 2009 with his wife Mandy Lemons, releasing three studio albums in 2011, 2014, and 2017, respectively.

Nikides died in Memphis, Tennessee, on April 9, 2024, at the age of 66.
