= Kevork Mardirossian =

American violinist (1954–2024)

Kevork Mardirossian (December 9, 1954 – June 11, 2024) was an American violinist. He was the James H. Rudy Professor of Music at Indiana University. Mardirossian served as the concertmaster of the Plovdiv Philharmonic Orchestra and the Baton Rouge Symphony Orchestra and was professor of violin at the University of Central Arkansas.

Mardirossian died in Bloomington, Indiana on June 11, 2024, at the age of 69.
