= Pinkish Black =

American band

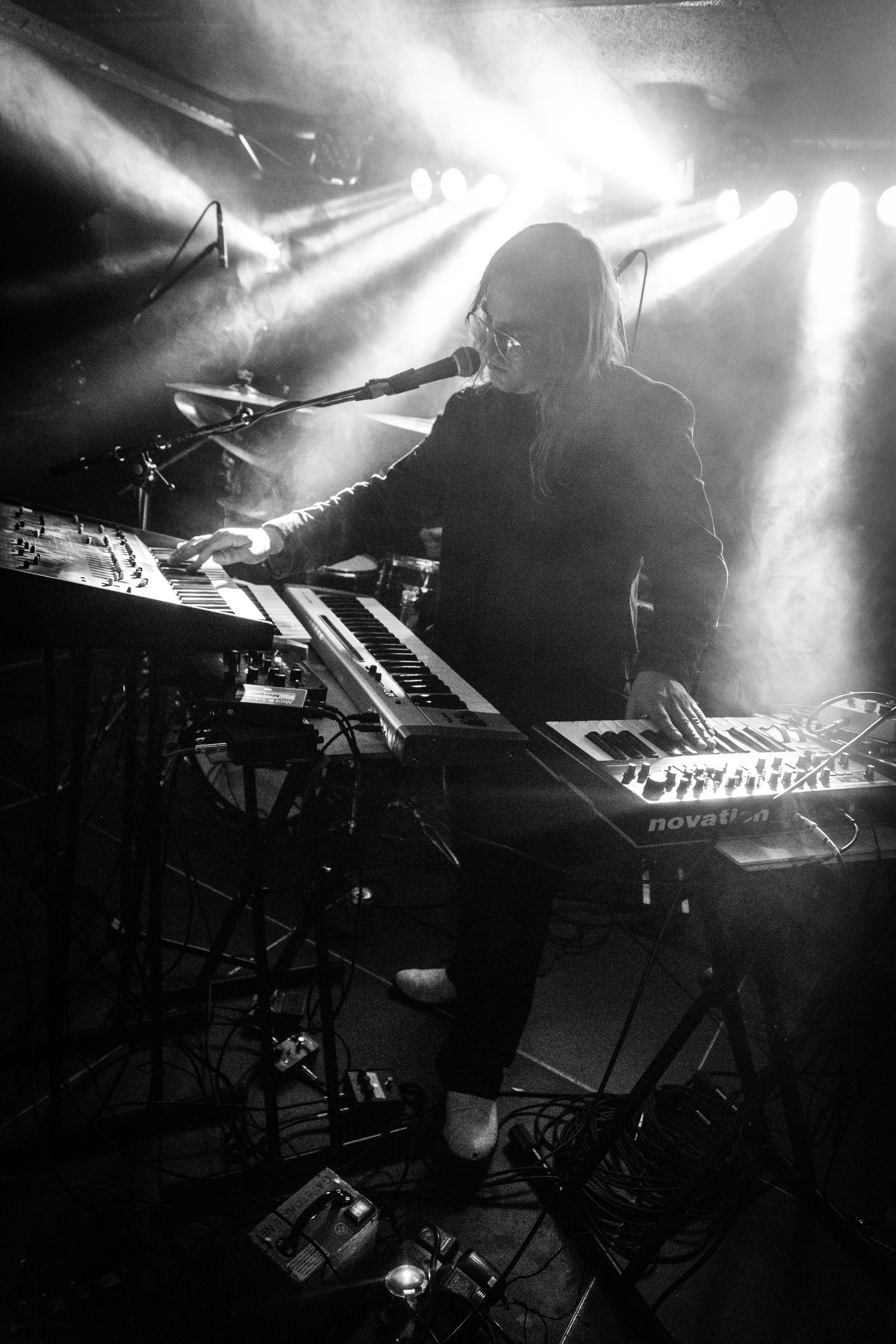
- Pinkish Black at Roadburn Festival, 2017

Background information
- Origin: Fort Worth, Texas, U.S.
- Genres: Experimental rock, psychedelic rock, drone, gothic rock, electronica, vaporwave, avant-metal
- Years active: 2010–present
- Labels: Century Media Records, Handmade Birds, Relapse Records
- Members: Jon Teague
- Past members: Daron Beck
- Website: www.soundcloud.com/pinkishblack

Pinkish Black is an American experimental sci-fi avant-metal synth-doom band from Fort Worth, Texas. The musical duo includes drums and synthesizer/keyboard only.

== Formation (2010) ==
In 2005, the members were part of an experimental hard rock trio called The Great Tyrant. After Tommy Atkins, the bassist for The Great Tyrant, committed suicide in 2010, the remaining members continued on as a duo ultimately named Pinkish Black. Daron Beck played keyboards and vocals and Jon Teague remained on drums and synthesizer.

== Self-titled debut (2011–2012) ==
The band had been signed from the Dada Drumming record label to Handmade Birds. Here, they spent time recording and mixing the music for their upcoming debut. On May 5, 2012, the self-titled LP was released.

== Century Media Records and Relapse Records (2012–present) ==
Beck and Teague were signed to Century Media Records on November 12, 2012. Their second album, Razed to the Ground, was released on September 17, 2013.

On December 4, 2014, Relapse Records announced that they had signed the band, and that the label would be releasing both Pinkish Black's third album and the final works of The Great Tyrant (entitled The Trouble With Being Born).

In 2019, Relapse released an album called Concept Unification, which explored themes of anxiety, futility and emptiness, that Beck claimed to have experienced as a child after ShowBiz Pizza Place rebranded itself into a Chuck E. Cheese.

In 2020, they released a joint album with avant-jazz band Yells at Eels entitled Vanishing Light in the Tunnel of Dreams.

Beck died in August 2024, at the age of 48.

== Discography ==
=== Studio albums ===
- 2012: Pinkish Black (Handmade Birds)
- 2013: Razed to the Ground (Century Media)
- 2015: Bottom of the Morning (Relapse Records)
- 2019: Concept Unification (Relapse Records)
- 2020: Vanishing Light in the Tunnel of Dreams (Ayler Records)
