= Pepe Justicia =

Spanish guitarist (1960–2024)

- Born: José Moreno Justicia; 1960; Mancha Real, Jaén, Spain
- Died: 10 November 2024 (aged 64)
- Genres: Flamenco
- Occupations: Musician; composer; teacher
- Instrument: Guitar
- Years active: 1974–2024
- Website: http://.pepejusticia.es

José Moreno Justicia (1960 – 10 November 2024), better known as Pepe Justicia, was a Spanish flamenco guitarist from Bélmez de la Moraleda, Jaén. A concert player and teacher, he got into flamenco aged 14, inspired by Paco de Lucía. His playing style is reminiscent of traditional flamenco from Jerez de la Frontera, where he resides since 1987. Justicia died on 10 November 2024, at the age of 64.
