= Naomy (Romanian singer) =

- Naomy in 2014

Background information
- Also known as: Naomi; Naomi Moldovan
- Born: 25 April 1977; Sighișoara, Romania
- Died: 19 April 2024 (aged 46) Dortmund, Germany
- Genres: Light
- Occupations: Singer; songwriter; actress
- Years active: 1997–2024
- Label: DeSanto Music Romania

Naomi Moldovan (25 April 1977 – 19 April 2024), professionally known also as Naomy, was a Romanian singer, songwriter, and actress. She came to native attention when entering the Romanian preselection for the Eurovision Song Contest 2014 with her song "Dacă tu iubești", where she finished in 10th place, scoring 3 points. Naomy has won the most awards at inter-county and national festivals of light music in Romania, holding a national record of 75 awards in 103 appearances, confirmed by Radio România Actualități in 1998 by Andrei Titus.

== Early life ==
Naomy was born on 25 April 1977, in Sighișoara and grew up in an orphanage located in Luduș until she was 15 years old, when she graduated from secondary study. Naomy was a Romani; three days after her birth, she was abandoned in a ditch.

== Career ==
=== 2008–2024: Career beginnings ===
In 2008, Naomi participated at the Mamaia Music Festival with the song "Salcia", written by Ionel Tudor, and her band, Naomi International, with which she also released a jazz album in the autumn of that year. In 2014, Naomy was the Romanian preselection for the Eurovision Song Contest 2014 with her song, "Dacă tu iubești", which was written by Rareş Borcea and composed by Jimi Laco. The track placed in 10th place out of 12, scoring 3 points. The next year, she aroused controversy by not passing the national preselection for the Eurovision Song Contest 2015, reportedly because frequent collaborator Mădălin Voicu was unlike last year not part of the preselection's jury. In late 2015, Naomy announced through her Facebook account that she would send two tracks she already finished, "What's Going On" and "Să-ți spun ce simt pentru noi", to the Italian, Swiss, Norwegian and Swedish preselection shows for the Eurovision Song Contest 2016. "Să-ți spun ce simt pentru noi" was written by Naomy herself, while production was handled by Marius Constantin.

== Personal life ==
Naomy used female pronouns to describe herself. She won the most awards at inter-county and national festivals of light music in Romania, holding a national record of 75 awards in 103 appearances, confirmed by Radio România Actualități in 1998 by Andrei Titus. Naomy possessed a soprano vocal range.

In February 2015, Naomy attempted suicide by swallowing painkiller pills. Shortly after the incident, she expressed when interviewed by Romanian newspaper Cancan that she cried all night and she could not sleep at all. She was like a small child. Alone, it was hard to manage her emotions and grief, so she swallowed painkiller pills. She was lucky to still be alive. She knew she could die last night. She was very confused. If the power still remained, she would decide if she would finish with her life, so no one can further judge her, or if she would continue her life and accept all the critics."

On 19 April 2024, Naomy died of a stroke in a hospital in Germany. She was six days short of her 47th birthday.

== Discography ==
=== Studio albums ===
- Un nou început (2006)

=== Singles ===
- "Dacă tu iubeşti" (2014)
- "Recunosc că mi-a fost dor de tine" (2014)
- "Rămâi cu mine în noaptea de Crăciun" (feat. Vladimir) (2014)

== Filmography ==
- The Crazy Stranger (1997)
