= Carmen Pateña =

- Born: March 7, 1941
- Origin: Philippines
- Died: July 31, 2024 (aged 83)
- Occupation: Singer
- Formerly of: Golden Divas

Carmen Pateña (March 7, 1941 – July 31, 2024) was a Filipino singer. Dubbed as "Asia's Ambassador of Songs", Pateña was a singer whose singing career peaked in the 1960s to the 1970s.

She held concerts both in the Philippines and overseas. Among her songs are "Shing A Ling Loo", "Pretty Girl", and "We Only Live Wais". Pateña often appeared in Seeing Stars with Joe Quirino on IBC 13 in the 1970s.

Long after her heydays, Pateña along with Pilita Corrales and Carmen Soriano would hold concerts together as the Golden Divas in 2008.

Pateña died on July 31, 2024, at the age of 83. Her remains were cremated.
