= Wulomei =

Ghanaian music group

Wulomei is a Ghanaian music group that was founded in 1973 by Nii Tei Ashitey, with the encouragement of the dramatist and musician Saka Acquaye. Acquaye managed the band and wrote some of the music.

Ashitey had previously been a percussionist for the Tempos led by E.T. Mensah, Tubman Stars and Worker's Brigade highlife bands, but decided to create a more "rootsy" sound to, as he once put it, "bring something out for the youth to progress and to forget foreign music and do their own thing".

During the 1970s and 1980s, Wulomei made a number of successful tours to Europe and the United States.

== Style and instruments ==
Except for an amplified guitar, played with the West African finger-picking style, Wulomei's instruments are indigenous, with atenteben bamboo flutes and traditional local percussion that includes the giant gombe frame drums, which provide a deep percussive "bass-line".

== Songs and music ==
Wulomei play old Ga and Liberian sea shanties, gome songs, and the kolomashie and kpanlogo recreational songs of Accra and also Akan highlife music. To portray the band's indigenous orientation, Wulomei's performers wear the white or yellow cloth and frilly hats of the Wulomei or traditional priests and priestesses of the Ga people of Accra.

== Albums ==
In 1974, Wulomei released its debut record, Walatu Walasa followed by Wulomei in Drum Conference released on the Phonogram label.

== Legacy and influence ==
Following Wulomei's initial success, there was a proliferation of so-called "Ga cultural groups" such as Blemabii, Dzadzeloi, Abladei, Agbafoi, and Ashiedu Keteke. Two members of Wulomei also created their own groups.

Wulomei's gombe drum player, "Big Boy" Nii Adu, formed the Bukom Ensemble and Wulomei's lead female singer, Naa Amanua, formed the Suku Troupe.

Ga rapper Kaseembebe has collaborated with Wulomei on several occasions. They released an album together called Akrowa. The song "Akrowa" sampled the 1973 version of Wulomei's song.

== Wulomei returns ==
Nii Ashitey has retired and the second-generation Wulomei is run by his son, Nii Ashiquey, and daughter, Naa Asheley.

== Sources ==
- Creative Storm Releases Three Maiden Albums
- Nii Ashitey & Wulomei
- Wulomei Preserves Folklore Music
- Wulomei Returns
