= Jaroslav Jeroným Neduha =

Czech musician (1945–2024)

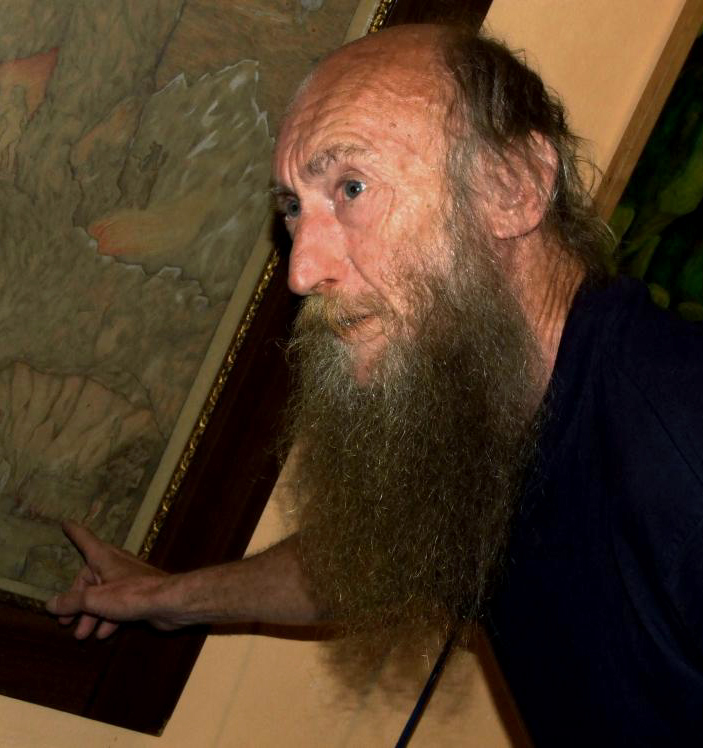
- Neduha in 2007

Background information
- Also known as: JJ Neduha
- Born: 7 August 1945; Česká Lípa, Czechoslovakia
- Died: 25 November 2024 (aged 79)
- Occupation: Singer-songwriter
- Instrument(s): Vocals, guitar

Jaroslav Jeroným Neduha (7 August 1945 – 25 November 2024) was a Czech singer-songwriter.

== Biography ==
In 1967, he appeared in Juraj Herz's film Kulhavý ďábel and subsequently became a professional actor in small roles. He then starred in several other films including Jiří Suchý's Nevěsta where he also sang. He formed Extempore in 1970, originally a folk band that later transformed into a rock band (1974). He left the band in 1978. In 1983, he was forced to leave Czechoslovakia. He then lived in Vienna until 1990 when he returned to Czechoslovakia and reformed Extempore. In 2016, he released his memoirs Životaběh.

Neduha died on 25 November 2024, at the age of 79. He was the older brother of Jiří Neduha.
