= Ferenc Sánta Jr. =

- Born: Ferenc Sánta Jr. 2 March 1945; Kaposvár, Hungary
- Died: 22 October 2024 (aged 79)
- Genres: Romani music
- Occupation: Musician
- Instrument: Violin
- Years active: 1969–2024
- Labels: Hungaroton

Ferenc Sánta Jr. (2 March 1945 – 22 October 2024) was a Hungarian Kossuth Prize and Franz Liszt Prize-winning violinist, fiddler and the artistic director of The Hungarian National Gipsy Orchestra.

== Biography ==
Sánta Jr. started playing violin at an early age of 7. He debuted in his father's band and completed musical school in Kaposvár. He played at Kaposvár Symphony Orchestra. Early in his musical career he was also the member of the Budapest Opera House orchestra. He has played with Gothenburg Symphony in 1969 and since then he is playing traditional Romani music. He made his first solo recording on Hungarian radio in 1972 and formed his first folk band in 1973. In 1981 he received the Hungarian television prize, in 1982 Hungarian radio prize, in 1995 the Cross of the Order of Merit of the Republic of Hungary award, in 2002 Franz Liszt Prize, in 2007 the Kossuth Prize, in 2009 Prima Primissima Prize and in 2011 he became the honorary citizen of Budapest. He was the maestro of The Hungarian National Gipsy Orchestra.

Sánta Jr. died on 22 October 2024, at the age of 79.

== Discography ==
- (1995) Ferenc Sánta and His Gypsy Band - Csárdás: Hungarian Gypsy Music - Naxos - 8.550954
- (1997) Ferenc Sánta Jr. and his Gypsy Band - A Hires Primas - Hungaroton - HCD10245
- Ferenc Sánta Jr. and his Gypsy Band - Hungarian Songs, Csardases - Hungaroton - HCD10330
