= Music of Gabon =

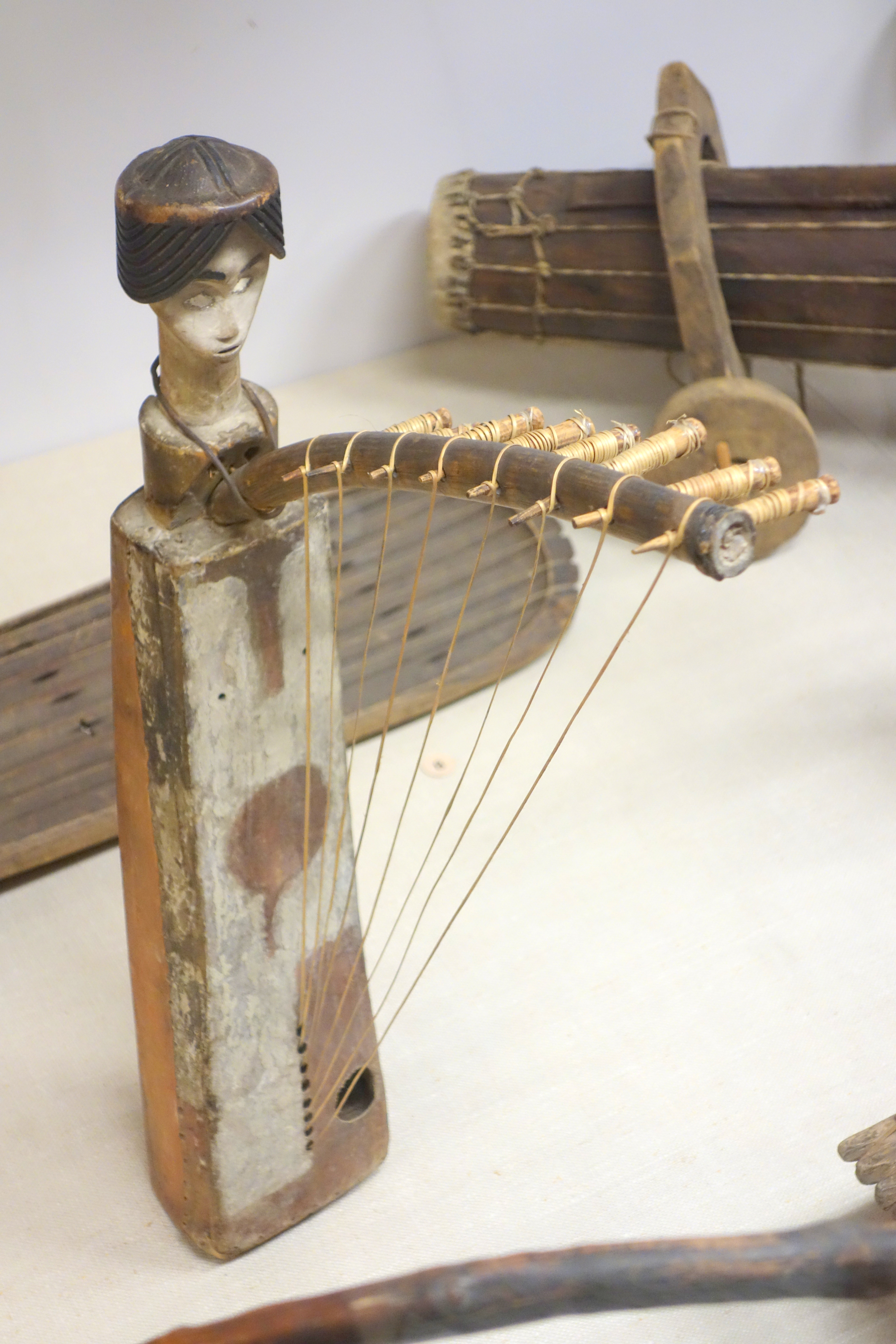
Ngombi of Fang people, type 3.

Music of Gabon encompasses the traditional, ritual, popular and urban musics of the Gabonese Republic. Scholarly literature describes Gabonese musical life as highly diverse, reflecting the country's ethnolinguistic plurality, especially Fang, Myènè, Teke, Punu, Njebi, Kota, Mitsogo and Babongo/Bongo communities, and the close historical connection between music, dance, healing, initiation and oral literature.

Gabonese musical traditions are especially notable for the importance of sung narrative, harp traditions, initiation repertories and dance societies. Among the best-known forms discussed in the literature are the Fang mvet, which denotes both an instrument and a genre of oral literature, and the harp-centred ritual musics of bwiti/bwete associations.

From the late colonial period onward, Gabonese musicians also absorbed influences from church music, French-language song, Congolese rumba, soukous, zouk and, later, global hip hop. In the post-independence era, music participated in the construction of a national culture, while remaining marked by regional styles and transnational circulation. Among the most internationally visible Gabonese recording artists are Pierre Akendengué, a singer-songwriter closely associated with poetic and pan-African composition, and Oliver N'Goma, whose 1990 album Bane became a major Afro-zouk success.

== Traditional and ritual music ==
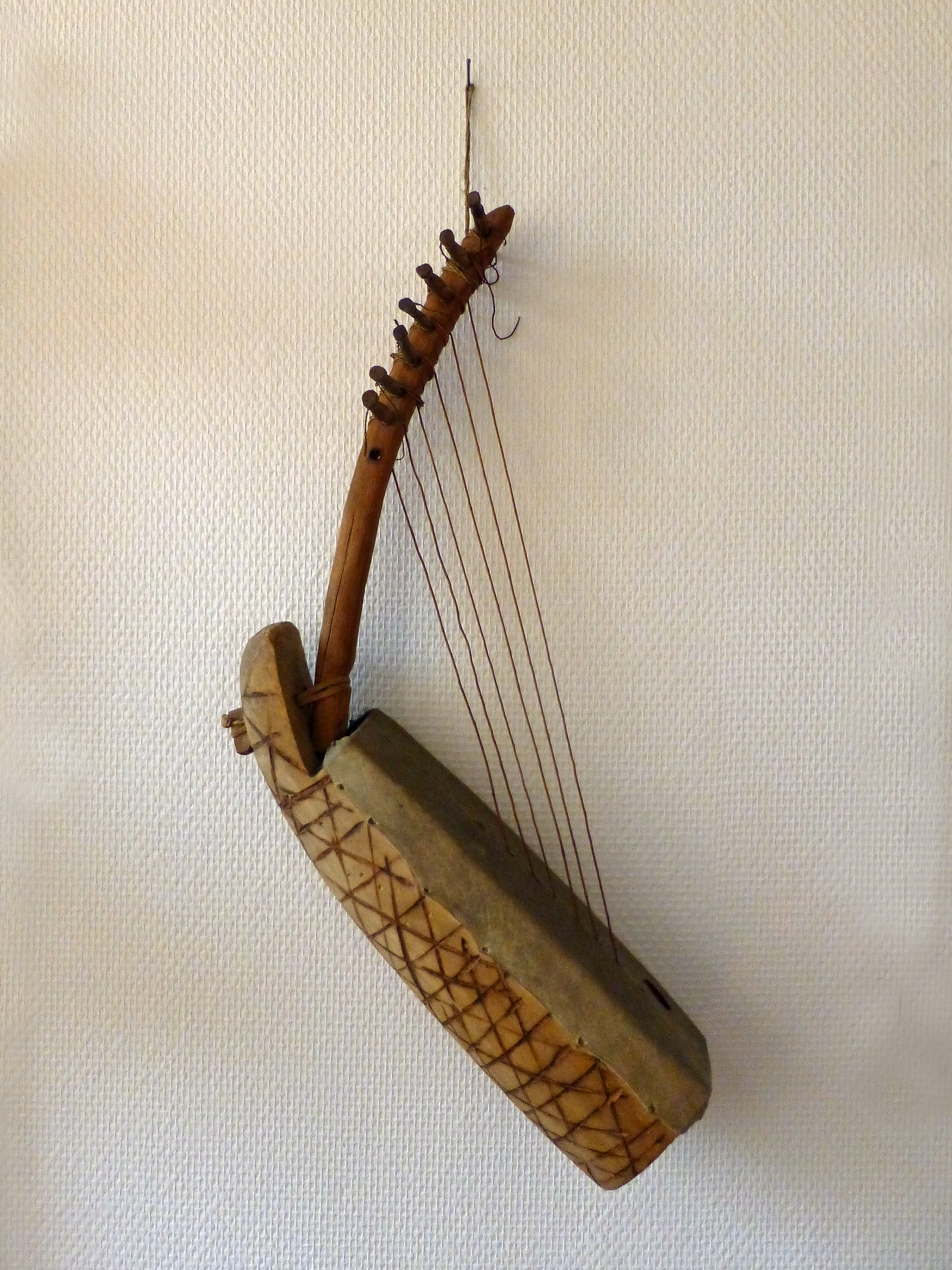
Ngombi of Fang people, type 3.

=== General characteristics ===
Traditional music in Gabon is inseparable from social context. Ethnomusicological work has emphasized that repertories are organized around ceremonies, age grades, healing, initiation, storytelling, collective celebration and dance, rather than around a single pan-Gabonese style. Instrumental practice is correspondingly varied: Norborg's survey of Gabon and Equatorial Guinea catalogued numerous harps, zithers, bows, drums, rattles, whistles and horns, while later monographs by Sylvie Le Bomin and collaborators documented localized repertoires among Teke, Myènè and Bongo communities.

The historical literature also records the importance of dance associations among the Fang. Jacques Binet's study of Fang dance societies treated dance, music, spectacle and changing social life as intertwined domains, and it remains a frequently cited source on the performative organization of Fang musical culture in the twentieth century.

=== The mvet ===
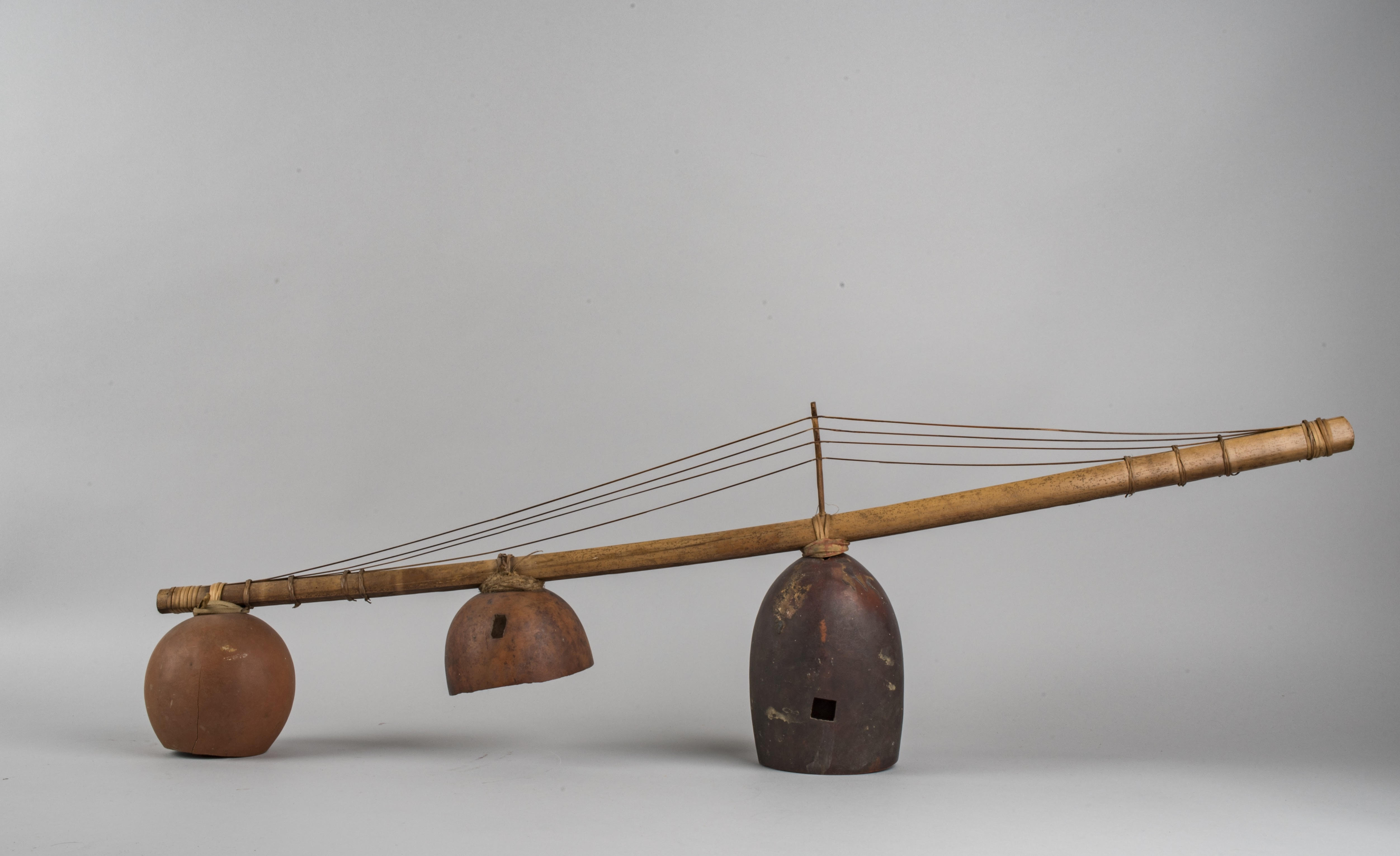
Mvet with multiple gourd resonators

Among Fang-speaking populations, the mvet is one of the most discussed Gabonese musical forms in the scholarly literature. Pierre Alexandre noted that the word mvet designates both a chordophone with resonators and the oral genres performed or declaimed to its accompaniment. The instrument is generally described as a zither-harp or harp-zither, built from a long plant stem with attached strings and calabash resonators.

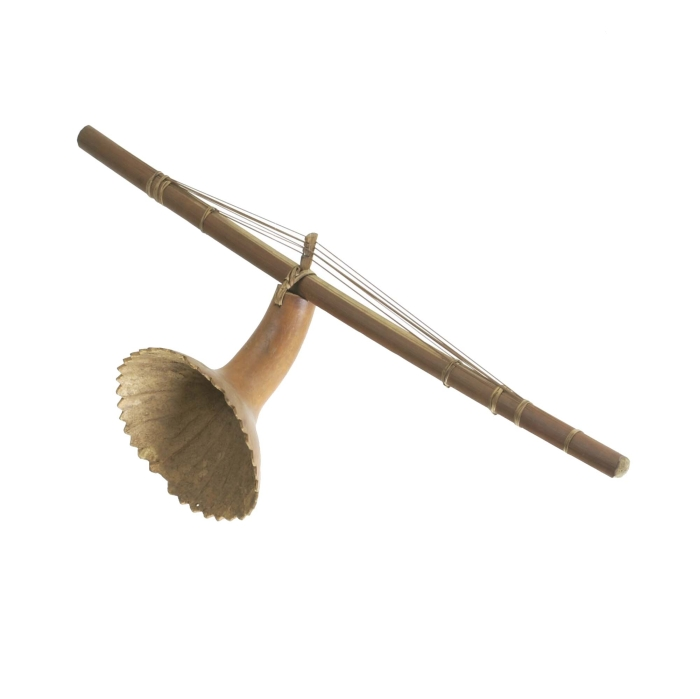
A short mvet with four strings and a single central resonator

As a performance genre, mvet is associated with extended sung and spoken narration, heroic themes, memory work and verbal virtuosity. It belongs to the wider Fang-Beti-Bulu epic complex that extends across present-day Gabon, Cameroon and Equatorial Guinea, but Gabonese scholarship has treated it as a major component of Fang expressive culture and, by extension, of Gabon's documented musical heritage. In later urban contexts, mvet has also been reinterpreted as a symbol of cultural authenticity and re-Africanization.

=== Bwiti and bwete music ===
Ritual music occupies a central place in studies of Gabon. The best-known example is the body of repertories associated with Bwiti (often also written bwete in some ethnographic contexts), a complex of initiation and healing practices documented especially among Fang and Mitsogo-related populations.

James W. Fernandez's classic studies describe music as a constitutive rather than merely decorative element of Fang Bwiti: chants, responsorial structures, dance, sermonizing and the ritual sound of the harp all participate in the production of symbolic consensus and religious experience. Philip Peek likewise singled out the Fang ngombi harp as a privileged medium of cross-world communication, arguing that in this ritual setting the sounding instrument is understood as more than a neutral musical device.

In south-central Gabon, Magali de Ruyter has described bwete music-making among Babɔngɔ Pygmies and their Mitsɔgɔ/Masangu neighbours as a site where ritual both reflects and negotiates unequal interethnic relations. In her account, performance in the ritual sphere simultaneously includes Babɔngɔ musicians in a shared ceremonial world and marks their subordinate position within the social order of neighbouring groups.

=== Regional diversity ===
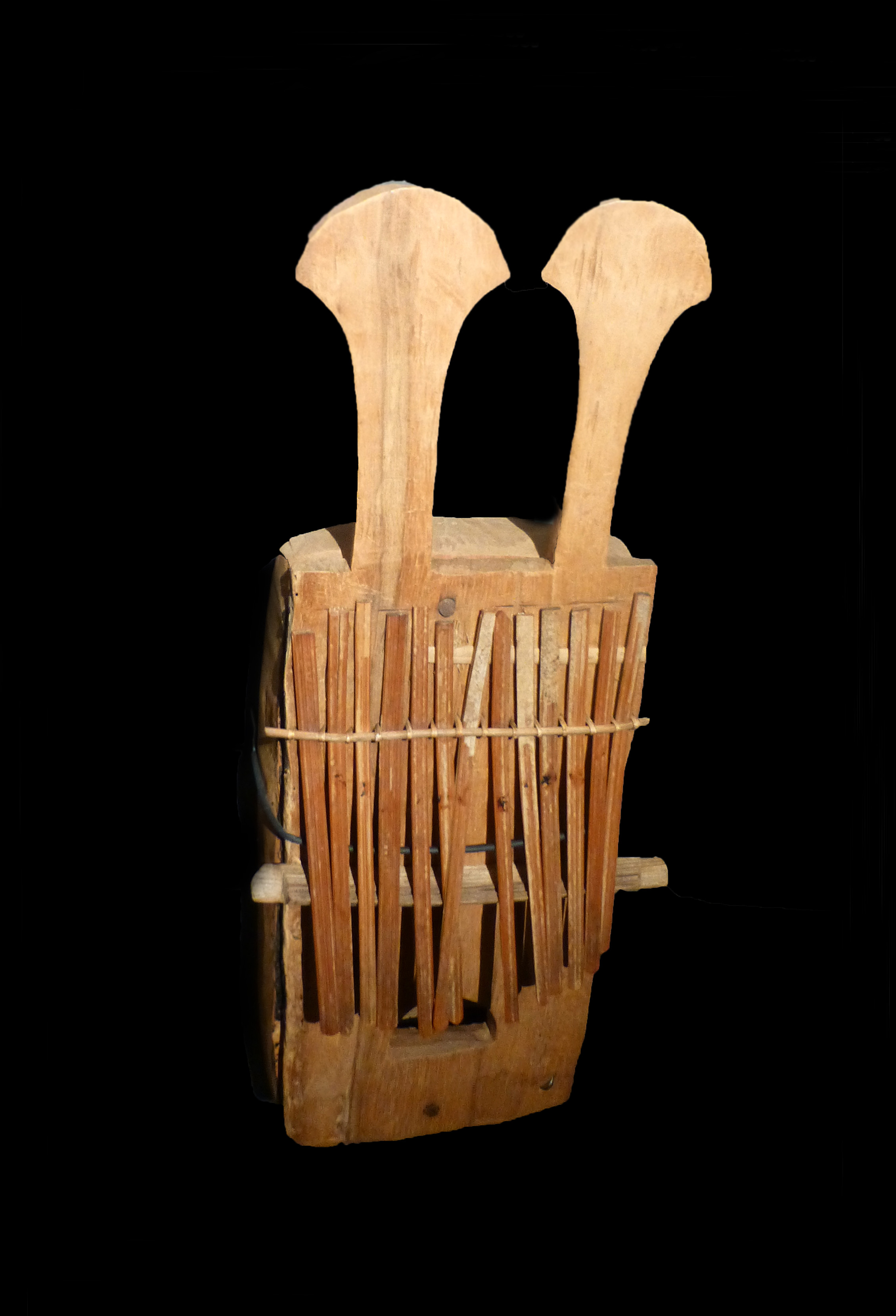
Gabonese sanza lamellophone

The idea of a single "Pygmy music" for Gabon has been challenged by later ethnomusicology. Sylvie Le Bomin and Jean-Émile Mbot argued that the various populations grouped under the label "Bongo" possess markedly different musical heritages, shaped by geography and by sustained contact with neighbouring non-Pygmy populations. Their study classifies these differences through repertories, instruments, vocal techniques and polyphonic processes rather than through a single essentialized ethnic style.

Comparable regional studies exist for other Gabonese communities. Le Bomin's work on Teke music and the joint Le Bomin–Bikoma volume on Myènè repertories document musical systems on their own terms, emphasizing the importance of local languages, instruments, dance forms and ceremonial repertories from the coast to the middle Ogooué region. These studies are important in the historiography of Gabonese music because they shift attention away from a few nationally known stars and toward the country's internally differentiated musical worlds.

== Popular music and the post-independence era ==
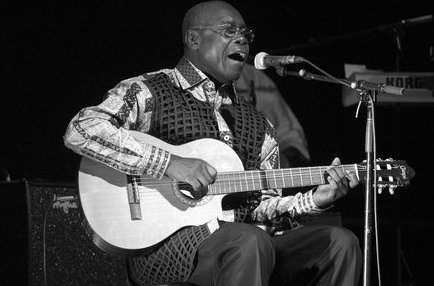
Pierre Akendengué performing

Urban popular music in Gabon developed within a broader Central African field shaped by colonial schools, mission churches, radio, recording, dance bands and the circulation of musicians and records across the former French Equatorial Africa and the Congo basin. As elsewhere in Francophone Central Africa, hybrid urban musics became important vehicles for modernity, political commentary and, eventually, national cultural expression. Douglas Yates has argued more generally that postcolonial Gabonese identity was imagined through a combination of African music, literature and art while French remained the national lingua franca.

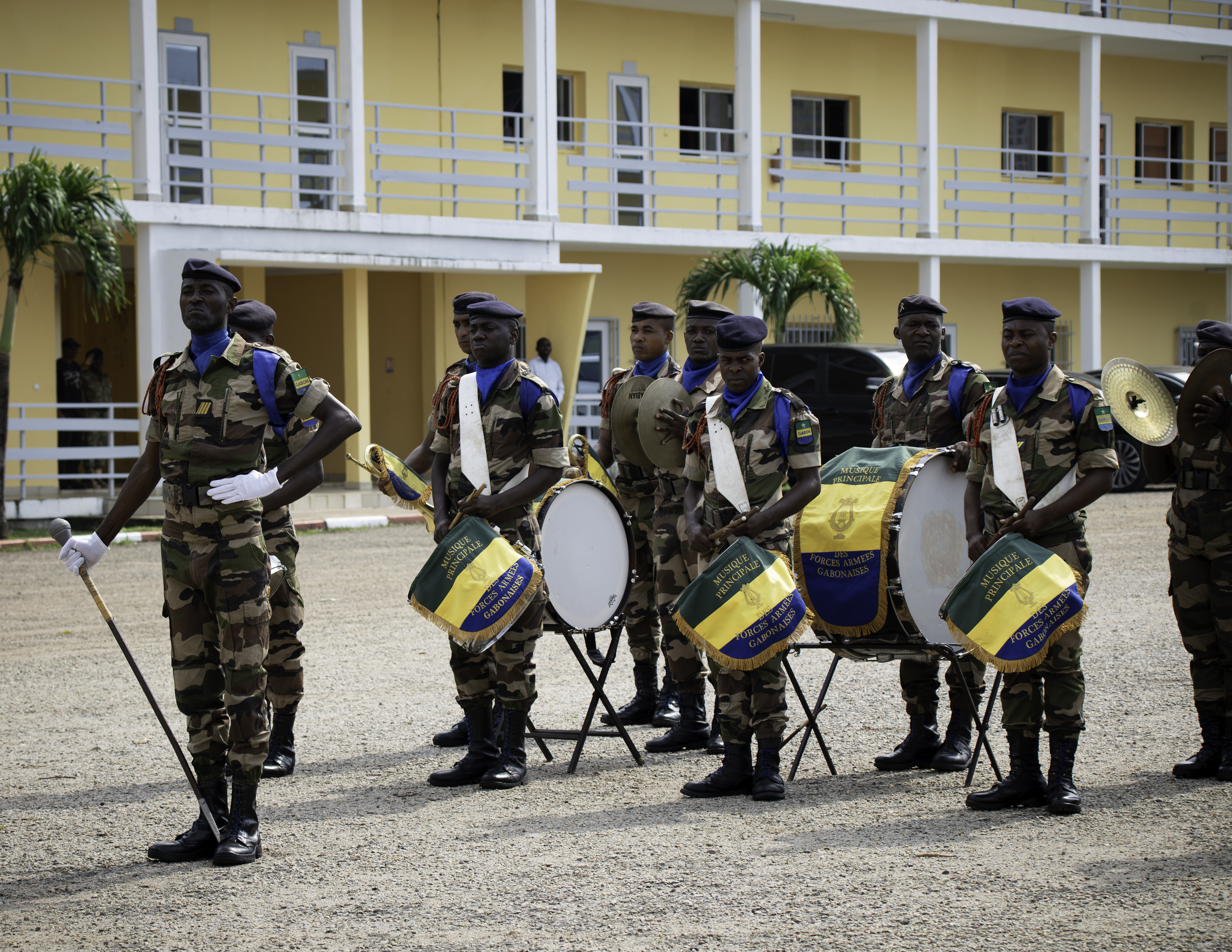
Armed Forces of Gabon band playing music during the Obangame Express 2024 Opening Ceremony. Libreville, May 2024

Within this setting, Pierre Akendengué became one of the most important figures in Gabonese recorded music. Scholarship on Akendengué repeatedly emphasizes the fusion of poetry and popular song in his work, his use of Gabonese imagery and his wider pan-African political horizon. Official artist biographies and later criticism date his first album, Nandipo, to 1974 and present him as a pioneering singer-poet whose recordings established a distinctive authored chanson in Gabonese popular music. His oeuvre has also drawn attention from film and literary scholars because of its engagement with anticolonial themes, African history and the political uses of musical modernity.

Other post-independence Gabonese artists worked in more dance-oriented idioms. The best-known case is Oliver N'Goma, whose career crystallized the importance of Afro-zouk in Gabon. According to his label biography, he began in school bands, trained as a cameraman, developed home demos in Libreville and Paris, and recorded the breakthrough album Bane with producer Manu Lima. The title track, issued in 1990, became the defining hit of his career and helped give Gabon one of its most internationally successful dance records.

== Hip hop, urban language and political performance ==
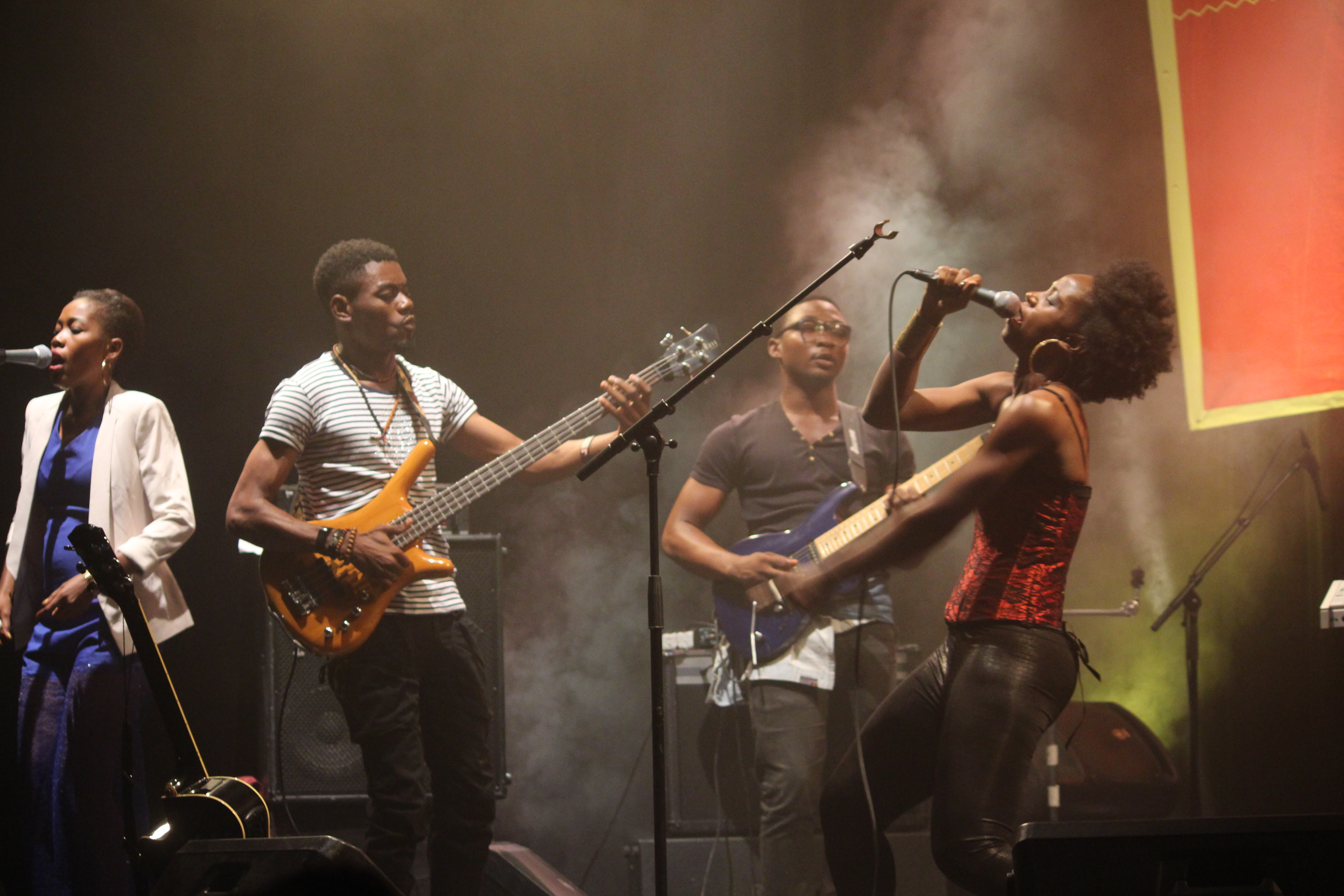
Pamela Badjogo performing

Hip hop became a major component of Gabonese urban music from the late 1980s onward. Alice Aterianus-Owanga's work traces the first rap groups to the end of that decade and links the expansion of rap performance in Libreville to the political opening and new freedoms associated with the transition to multiparty politics in 1990.

In Gabon, rap was not only an imported genre but also a site of linguistic and cultural experimentation. Aterianus-Owanga argues that artists framed their practice through a claim to "orality," which was expressed in at least three ways: the formation of youth slang such as toli bangando, the creative reuse of the Fang mvet, and the staging of initiation-society symbols within rap and slam performance. In that sense, Gabonese hip hop developed not simply through imitation of U.S. or French models but through a deliberate localization in vernacular aesthetics and local historical memory.

The same scholarship also stresses the genre's political entanglements. Aterianus-Owanga describes Gabonese rap as having long maintained ambiguous relations with state power and the Bongo presidential family. After the contested 2009 election and the repression that followed, many festivals disappeared, concert spaces closed and several rappers went into exile; the result was a prolonged crisis in the rap world and the widespread claim that "Gabonese rap was dead." By the late 2010s, however, digital media, collaborative projects and the symbolic resources of healing ritual contributed to a partial revival, including performances that explicitly referenced Bwiti aesthetics.

== Recording, mediation and transnational circulation ==
Recent scholarship has emphasized that Gabonese musical traditions cannot be understood only within the borders of the nation-state. Alice Aterianus-Owanga and Rémy Jadinon have shown how Gabonese initiation musics circulated through cassettes, video clips and mobile performers, creating new routes between ritual space, the city and diasporic publics. Their article argues that ritual music did not simply lose meaning when recorded; rather, new media became part of the social life of these repertories and of their recontextualization beyond the initiation setting.

This line of research has widened the scope of Gabonese music studies. Instead of opposing "traditional" and "modern" repertoires, it examines the movement of melodies, symbols, instruments and performers across ritual, commercial and political arenas. In that sense, Gabonese music offers a particularly clear example of how African musical forms can remain locally rooted while circulating through national and transnational media networks.

== Scholarship and documentation ==
The study of Gabonese music has depended heavily on ethnography, oral performance studies and sound documentation. Foundational contributions include Jacques Binet on Fang dance societies, Pierre Alexandre on the mvet, James W. Fernandez on Bwiti, Philip Peek on the ritual semantics of sound, and Åke Norborg's handbook of instruments from Gabon and Equatorial Guinea. More recent work by Sylvie Le Bomin, Florence Bikoma, Jean-Émile Mbot, Magali de Ruyter and Alice Aterianus-Owanga has deepened the documentation of regional repertories, hunter-gatherer traditions, initiation music, urban rap and the politics of performance.

== Notable musicians ==
- Pierre Akendengué
- Oliver N'Goma
- Patience Dabany
- Pierre-Claver Zeng Ebome
- SeBa
- Annie-Flore Batchiellilys
- Frédéric Gassita
- Pamela Badjogo
- Anaïs Cardot

== See also ==
- Culture of Gabon
- Music of Africa
- Bwiti
- Mvet
