= 2024 in African music =

The following is a list of events and releases that happened in 2024 in African music.

== Events ==
- January 15 – Qing Madi, OdumoduBlvck, Bloody Civilian, and Tyla are inducted into Apple Music's Rising Class of 2024.
- January 19 – Rwandan singer Bruce Melodie and his manager announce his investment in United Generation Basketball.
- February 4 – At the 66th Annual Grammy Awards, the Grammy Award for Best African Music Performance are awarded for the first time. Nominees are Asake & Olamide – "Amapiano"; Burna Boy – "City Boys"; Davido ft. Musa Keys – "Unavailable"; Ayra Starr – "Rush"; and Tyla – "Water" The winner of the African Music category is Tyla. Burna Boy, who is nominated for the Best Melodic Rap Performance, also performs live during the ceremony.
- March 23 – AFRIMA President Mike Dada announces the launch of BridgeAfric Southern Africa.
- June 25 – Davido, a year after confirming that he has married his partner, Chioma Rowland, holds a formal ceremony in Victoria Island, Lagos, attended by many prominent figures.
- November 4 – Rwandan-born singer, rapper and writer Gaël Faye is awarded the Prix Renaudot for his novel Jacaranda.
- November 7 – The Feather Awards winners, announced in Johannesburg, South Africa, include Zoë Modiga as Best Musician.

== Albums released in 2024 ==
Release date	Artist	Album	Genre	Label	Ref
February 16	Les Amazones d'Afrique	Musow Danse	Mande Music/Electropop	Real World Records	
February 23	Aziza Brahim	Mawja		Glitterbeat	
February 23	The Soil	Reimagined	Kasi soul		
March 22	Tyla	Tyla	Amapiano, Western pop, hip hop and R&B	Fax and Epic Records	
May 31	Ayra Starr	The Year I Turned 21	Afrobeats	RCA	
June 7	Tems	Born in the Wild	R&B and Afrobeats	Fantasy Records	
August 9	Asake	Lungu Boy	Afropiano and Afrofusion		
August 29	Fireboy DML	Adedamola	Pop, Contemporary R&B and Afrobeats		
October 11	Elaine	Stone Heart Cold	Contemporary R&B		
November 15	Khuzani	Angidlali Nezingane	Maskandi		
November 22	Wizkid	Morayo	R&B, Afrobeats		

== Deaths ==
- January 29 – Tony Cedras, 71, South African jazz musician
- February 21 – Getachew Kassa, 79, Ethiopian percussionist and singer
- March 3 – Félix Sabal Lecco, 64/5, Cameroonian drummer
- March 5 – Brahim Fribgane, Moroccan oud player and percussionist (death announced on this date)
- March 8 – Abdou Cherif, 52, Moroccan singer (heart attack)
- April 9 – Muluken Melesse, 65-70, Ethiopian singer and drummer
- April 21 – KODA, 45, Ghanaian gospel singer.
- May 1 – Hasna El-Bacharia, 74, Algerian singer and multi-instrumentalist
- May 5 – Belgacem Bouguenna, 61, Tunisian singer
- May 15 – Ahmed Piro, 92, Moroccan singer of Andalusi classical music
- May 29 – Mansour Seck, 69, Senegalese singer
- June 30 – Lucius Banda, 53, Malawian musician and former MP
- July 19 – Toumani Diabaté, 58, Malian kora player
- August 27 – Makaya Ntshoko, 84, South African jazz drummer
- September 6 (death announced) – Mapaputsi (Sandile Ngwenya), 45, South African Kwaito musician
- September 17 – Rise Kagona, 62, Zimbabwean musician (Bhundu Boys)
- October 2 – Arbogaste Mbella Ntone, 82, Cameroonian singer
- December 3 – Jan Bloukaas, 25, South African singer (brain cancer)
- December 7 – Steady Bongo, 58, Sierra Leonean musician and record producer (road accident)
- December 11 – Corinne Allal, 69, Tunisian-born Israeli rock musician and music producer (pancreatic cancer)
- December 13 – Koko Ateba, age unknown, Cameroonian singer and guitarist

== See also ==
- 2024 in music
