= Amazones Power =

Studio album by Les Amazones d'Afrique
- Released: January 24, 2020
- Recorded: May 2018 – April 2019
- Studios: Baniko House (Bamako); Dahomey Studio (Paris); Es Cuartet Studio (Mallorca); Studios de la Seine (Paris); Studio Teriya Mali Production (Bamako)
- Genres: World; African hip-hop; Congotronix; desert blues; dub; electronica; Griot funk; pop
- Length: 55:36
- Label: Real World Records
- Producer: Liam Farrell

Les Amazones d'Afrique chronology
République Amazone (2017)	Amazones Power (2020)	Musow Danse (2024)

Singles from Amazones Power
- 1. "Amazones Power" Released: May 3, 2019; 2. "Heavy" Released: July 12, 2019; 3. "Smile" Released: November 8, 2019; 4. "Love" Released: January 10, 2020

Amazones Power is the second studio album by West-African female musical collective Les Amazones d'Afrique. It was released through Real World Records on January 28, 2020, almost three years after their debut album, République Amazone (2017). The album was recorded between May 2018 and April 2019 in Mali, France and Spain, and similar to the debut album, was produced by Irish-Parisian musician Liam Farrell (a.k.a. Doctor L.) The album marks a change in the line-up of the collective since the debut album, with only original members Mamani Keïta and Rokia Koné returning, but joined by a number of new singers from the continent of Africa as well as the African diaspora. The album establishes a core membership of four singers, who also form the line-up for the band's live shows: Mamani Keïta (Mali), Fafa Ruffino (Benin), Niariu (France/Guinea), and Kandy Guira (Burkina Faso). Other vocalists on the album are Rokia Koné, Ami Yerewolo, Nacera Ouali Mesbah, Amadou Dembélé, Boy-Fall and Jon Grace. The album has a total of 19 featured singers, with the title track 'Power' including 16 voices from 3 different continents. The album's lyrics are sung in a variety of different African languages, as well as English and French.

Upon its release the album received strong critical praise, particularly in the pop and rock music press, with emphasis the album's production and variety in musical styles, as well as the strong feminist messages conveyed in the songs. Some world music reviewers who gave negative reviews of the band's first album, criticising the production, gave Amazones Power positive reviews. The album was chosen as Future Music's Album of the Month in January 2020, receiving a critical score of 10/10. In June 2020, the album was included in NPR Music's 25 Favourite albums of 2020 (so far).

Les Amazones d'Afrique launched the album at a private event which took place at Real World Studios on Tuesday 28 January 2020. The band gave a performance featuring several songs from the album, and it was broadcast live on social media.

== Conception and recording ==
Amazones Power, like its predecessor République Amazone, is an album of songs to promote the feminist causes of the group, i.e. the fight against violence towards women, and gender equality, particularly in Africa. Specifically, denouncing the practice of female genital mutilation is a primary theme of the album, with several tracks on the album addressing this subject.

Recording began in April 2018 in Bamako, where the majority of the album's traditional African instrumentation was captured, e.g. doundoun, tama, djembe, as well as guitars, drums and bass parts for the songs "Queens", "Dreams", "Timbuktu", "Red", "Rebels" and "Dogon". This was followed by additional sessions in Paris and Mallorca in May and June 2018, capturing the vocals and additional instrumentation for Rokia Koné's featured songs "Queens", "Dreams" and "Red". Further recording was done in September 2018, completing the recording of songs "Timbuktu", "Rebels" and "Dogon".

The rest of the album's songs took shape during top-line songwriting sessions at Studio de la Seine in Paris between February and April 2019. Sixteen vocalists were assembled on 13 and 14 February to write and record the song "Power" (originally released as "Amazones Power") using an instrumental track created by producer Liam Farrell, which was released in May 2019. This process is documented in the official video for the song. The songs "Heavy", "Love", "Smile", "Smooth", "Fights" and "Sisters" were written and recorded in subsequent recording sessions at Studio de la Seine, Paris and Baniko House, Bamako, and followed the same process of top-line songwriting using Liam Farrell's instrumental tracks.

== Music and lyrics ==
=== Composition ===
Amazones Power is fifty five minutes long, consisting of 13 tracks. It has been described as an album of pan-African styles with elements of traditional griot funk, electronica, pop, desert blues, African hip-hop, dub and reggae. The album is defined by two distinct approaches to recording and production — songs based on live band recording sessions such as "Dreams", and songs based on instrumental tracks created by producer Liam Farrell to which the singers added lyrics and melodies, such as "Sisters". All tracks are co-written by Liam Farrell and the featured singers. The album is notable for its mix of African and contemporary music styles. Q Magazine described the album as "a rousing and defiantly modern revolution in sound", and a review in The Sunday Times credited Liam Farrell's ability to "break new ground without imposing a slickly commercial backdrop". Mojo's David Hutcheon noted that Liam Farrell excels on the songs "Timbuktu", "Heavy" and "Sisters", which he called "bridges between traditional griot funk, western clubland and conscious African hip-hop."

=== Lyrics and themes ===
There a total of 15 languages used on the album, with Bambara being the most common, featuring in 9 of the album's 13 tracks. Bambara, French, English, Mooré, Yoruba, Dendi, Kabyle and Wolof are used on tracks 1–12, with the additional languages Spanish, Cameroon, Mbo, Lingala, French Guianese Creole, Nanga and Bulu being used on the final track, "Power". Campaigning for an end to female genital mutilation is a key lyrical theme of the album. The songs "Love", "Fights", "Sisters" and "Power" directly address the issue, and specifically speak to female perpetrators of the practice. The songs "Smooth" and "Timbuktu" speak directly to men, pointing out the strength of women and advocating for gender equality and more opportunities for women in positions of responsibility. The songs "Heavy" and "Queens" pay tribute to women's resilience and determination, whilst "Red" and "Dogon" advocate for social cohesion and mutual respect.

== Release and promotion ==
The first song to be released from the album was "Amazones Power" (named "Power" on the album), which was released as a single on May 3, 2019. It was promoted with a music video capturing the process of writing and recording the song, and it supported a European summer tour, which featured a new band line-up. During the tour, the band premiered a number of songs from the new album. "Heavy", the second single, was released on July 12, 2019, and featured a video with candid footage of the band on tour. The album itself was announced on November 8, 2019, and was accompanied by the release of a third single, "Smile". On January 10, 2020 "Love" was released as the final single in advance of the album on January 24, 2020.

The album was released on CD, vinyl and digital formats. The album cover features a portrait of band member Niariu posing behind a dark blue background, and the inner packaging of both the CD and vinyl editions features a group photograph of the core band members Fafa Ruffino, Mamani Keïta, Niariu and Kandy Guira, as well as a grid of 16 individual head shot photographs of the singers featured on the closing track, "Power".

The band made their debut live appearance in the USA on January 12, 2020, at The Copacabana in New York City as part of GlobalFEST, and visited the UK on the week of the album's release, performing at Celtic Connections festival in Glasgow and The Jazz Café in London. In between these UK dates, they also performed at Real World Studios as part of an album launch party organised by their record label, Real World Records. Following the album release, the band fulfilled a short tour of Sweden and the first show of a 16-date "Amazones Power Live" tour of France before circumstances surrounding the global COVID-19 pandemic caused the postponement of further scheduled dates.

== Critical reception ==
Professional ratings
Aggregate scores
Source	Rating
Metacritic	85/100
Review scores
Source	Rating
Financial Times	4/5 stars
Louder Than War	5/5 stars
Mojo	4/5 stars
MusicOMH	4/5 stars
New Internationalist	4/5 stars
PopMatters	4/5 stars
Q	4/5 stars
Songlines	4/5 stars
Uncut	8/10

Amazones Power received positive reviews from music critics, with resounding praise for the album's unique production and blend of different genres. At Metacritic, which assigns a normalized rating out of 100 to reviews from mainstream publications, the album received an average score of 85 based on 5 sources, indicating "universal acclaim".

Q magazine's Rupert Howe described the album as "a rousing and definitely modern revolution in sound", and UK music technology magazine Future Music gave it 10/10 in their review, choosing it as their album of the month. They said "Amazones Power is an album full of power, strength, positivity and hope that unites people together to demand a future that is as accepting and joyous as the music itself." In his Sunday Times review, Clive Davis defended the album's progressive production, saying that "whilst some purists may feel that the producer Liam Farrell (alias Doctor L) gilds the lily, he actually manages to break new ground without imposing a slickly commercial backdrop."

In particular, the more electronic-based sound to the album was noted by several reviewers. The Arts Desk described the album as having "a much more contemporary electronic feel, with the influence of hip hop and electronic dance music dripping into the proceedings", and in a mid-year "best of" list NPR Music's Andrew Flanagan said Liam Farrell gave his electronics "a busier serration and heft."

Several reviewers commended the album for injecting new energy to the band through the introduction of new vocalists. Mojo's David Hutcheon remarked that the "rolling membership opens up the palette considerably", whilst the New Internationalist noted the album had "a much more underground sound than its predecessor [...] due to the change in personnel." In Nigel Williamson's review for Uncut, he suggested the change in membership — namely the absence of "star names" Oumou Sangaré and Mariam Doumbia (of Amadou & Mariam) — was "a blessing in disguise", with new members "lending a youthfully purposive and fearless energy to songs about misogyny, sexual identity, forced marriage and FGM."

The Financial Times review by David Honigmann positively contrasted the album with the band's debut, stating that on the first album Liam Farrell had "submerged the women's voices... in a fidgety, cluttered sound world", whilst the new album at its best "recaptures not just the energy but also the clarity of [the band's] early live sets."

=== Lists ===
Amazones Power was placed in several 2020 mid-year best music lists from publications:

Amazones Power on mid-year lists
Publication	List	Rank	Ref.
NPR Music	NPR Music's 25 Favorite Albums Of 2020 (So Far)	—N/a	
PopMatters	The 50 Best Albums of 2020 So Far	—N/a	

== Track listing ==
Amazones Power track listing
No.	Title	Writer(s)	Producer(s)	Length
1.	"Heavy" (featuring Niariu, Boy-Fall and Jon Grace)	Liam Farrell a.k.a. Doctor L; Tiguidanké Diallo a.k.a. Niariu; Boy-Fall; Jon Grace	Farrell	3:22
2.	"Love" (featuring Mamani Keïta)	Farrell; Mamani Keïta	Farrell	3:23
3.	"Smile" (featuring Niariu and Ami Yerewolo)	Farrell; Diallo; Ami Yerewolo	Farrell	4:23
4.	"Queens" (featuring Rokia Koné)	Farrell; Rokia Koné	Farrell	3:56
5.	"Smooth" (featuring Mamani Keïta)	Farrell; Keïta	Farrell	4:31
6.	"Dreams" (featuring Rokia Koné)	Farrell; Koné	Farrell	6:18
7.	"Timbuktu" (featuring Mamani Keïta and Amadou Démbéle)	Farrell; Keïta; Amadou Démbéle	Farrell	4:12
8.	"Red" (featuring Rokia Koné)	Farrell; Koné	Farrell	3:29
9.	"Rebels" (featuring Nacera Ouali Mesbah)	Farrell; Nacera Ouali Mesbah	Farrell	4:39
10.	"Dogon" (featuring Mamani Keïta and Amadou Démbéle)	Farrell; Keïta; Démbéle	Farrell	4:21
11.	"Fights" (featuring Fafa Ruffino)	Farrell; Fafa Ruffino	Farrell	3:26
12.	"Sisters" (featuring Kandy Guira)	Farrell; Kandy Guira	Farrell	5:00
13.	"Power"	Farrell; Diallo; Guira; Keïta; Mesbah; Ruffino; Boy-Fall; Jon Grace; Marta Domingo; Aminata Dramé a.k.a. Nakou; Roselyne Belinga; Nancy Murillo; Moesha13; Valérie Tribord; Valérie Belinga; Abby Surya; Patricia Essong; Valérie Malot; Felipe Cabrera	Farrell; Cabrera	4:40
Total length:				55:36

== Credits and personnel ==
Credits are adapted from the album's liner notes.

=== Vocals ===
==== Featured vocalists ====
- Amadou Démbéle (7, 10)
- Boy-Fall (1, 13)
- Tiguidanké Diallo a.k.a. Niariu (1, 3, 13)
- Jon Grace (1, 13)
- Kandy Guira (12, 13)
- Mamani Keïta (2, 5, 7, 10, 13)
- Rokia Koné (4, 6, 8)
- Nacera Ouali Mesbah (9, 13)
- Fafa Ruffino (11, 13)
- Ami Yerewolo (3)

==== Guest vocalists on "Power" ====
- Roselyne Belinga
- Valérie Belinga
- Marta Domingo
- Amanita Dramé a.k.a. Nakou
- Patricia Essong
- Moesha13
- Nancy Murillo
- Abby Surya
- Valérie Tribord

==== Backing vocalists ====
- Nanou Coul (7, 10)
- Fatoumata 'Kaka' Coulibaly (4, 6, 8)
- Tiguidanké Diallo a.k.a. Niariu (2, 5, 11, 12, 13)
- Kandy Guira (2, 5, 11)
- Mamani Keïta (11, 12)
- Maïmouna 'Maï Ba' Ouedrago (4, 6, 8)
- Fafa Ruffino (2, 5, 12)

=== Musicians ===
- Llorenç Barceló – Hammond B3 (4, 6, 8)
- Felipe Cabrara – double bass (7); production, musical direction (13)
- Amadou Dembélé – djembé (4, 6, 7, 8, 9, 10)
- Mamadou Diabaté – doundoun (4, 6, 7, 8, 9, 10)
- Abdou Diallo – doundoun superposé (4, 6, 7, 8, 9, 10)
- Souleyman Diallo a.k.a. Bavieux – rhythm guitar (4, 6, 7, 8, 9, 10)
- Liam Farrell – various instruments (1–13), production (1–12)
- Sountoucoumba "Salif" Koné – lead guitar (2–13)
- Joe Palmer – drums (4, 6, 8)
- Yaya Samake – drums (4, 6, 8, 9)
- Amadou Sissoko – tama (4, 6, 7, 8, 9, 10)
- Inor Sotolngo – congos (2)
- Nabil Tamarat – darbouka (9)

=== Technical ===
- Sylvain Mercier – recording (1, 2, 3, 5, 7, 9, 10, 11, 12, 13)
- Khoï Huynh – assistant recording (1, 2, 3, 7, 9, 10, 11, 12, 13)
- Aba Sangaré a.k.a. Le Dynozor – recording (3), assistant engineering (4, 6, 8)
- Yaya Diarra – recording (4, 6, 7, 8, 9, 10)
- Patrick Ruffino – recording (4, 6, 8)
- Liam Farrell – mixing (1–12)
- Grant Phabao – mastering (1–12)
- Grant Phabao – mastering (1–12)
- Paulo Abehlo – mixing, mastering (13)
- Valérie Malot – mixing (13)
- Felipe Cabrera – mixing (13)
- José Avelino – assistant mixing (13)

Mixing and mastering locations

- Doctor L Studio (Dakar) – mixing (1–12)
- Paris DJ Studio (Paris) – mastering (1–12)
- Armazém do Bairro Studio (Portugal) – mastering (13)

=== Studios ===
Main recording locations

- Studios de la Seine (Paris) – recording (1, 2, 3, 5, 7, 9, 10, 11, 12, 13)
- Studio Teriya Mali Production (Bamako) – recording (4, 6, 7, 8, 9, 10)

Additional recording locations

- Baniko House (Bamako) – recording (3)
- Dahomey Studio (Paris) – recording (4, 6, 8)
- Es Cuartet Studio (Mallorca) (4, 6, 8)

=== Management and marketing ===
- Valérie Malot – executive producer, creator/director
- Noah Dufour – assistant executive producer
- Aba Sangaré a.k.a. Le Dynozor – recording co-ordination (Bamako)
- Cynthia Rambaud – production
- Oran Mullan – project co-ordination
- Marc Bessant – design
- Karen Paulina Biswell – photography
- Michelle TSM – styling
- Nacho Jewels – styling
- Nomai – styling
- Rod Labelle – styling assistant
- Oldie Mbani – make-up artist
- Laurianne Emboli – assistant make-up artist
- Arwa Haider – sleeve notes
