= Rimba language =

Language variety spoken by the Babongo-Rimba pygmies of Gabon

Rimba
- Irimba
- Native to: Gabon
- Ethnicity: Barimba Pygmies
- Language family: unclassified (Punu ?)

Language codes
- ISO 639-3: None (mis)
- Glottolog: None

Rimba (Irimba) is the speech variety of the Babongo-Rimba pygmies of Gabon. Generally considered a dialect of Punu, it may preserve a core of non-Bantu vocabulary, and so to be conservative should be considered unclassified.
