= Mariam Koné =

Malian singer (born 1987)

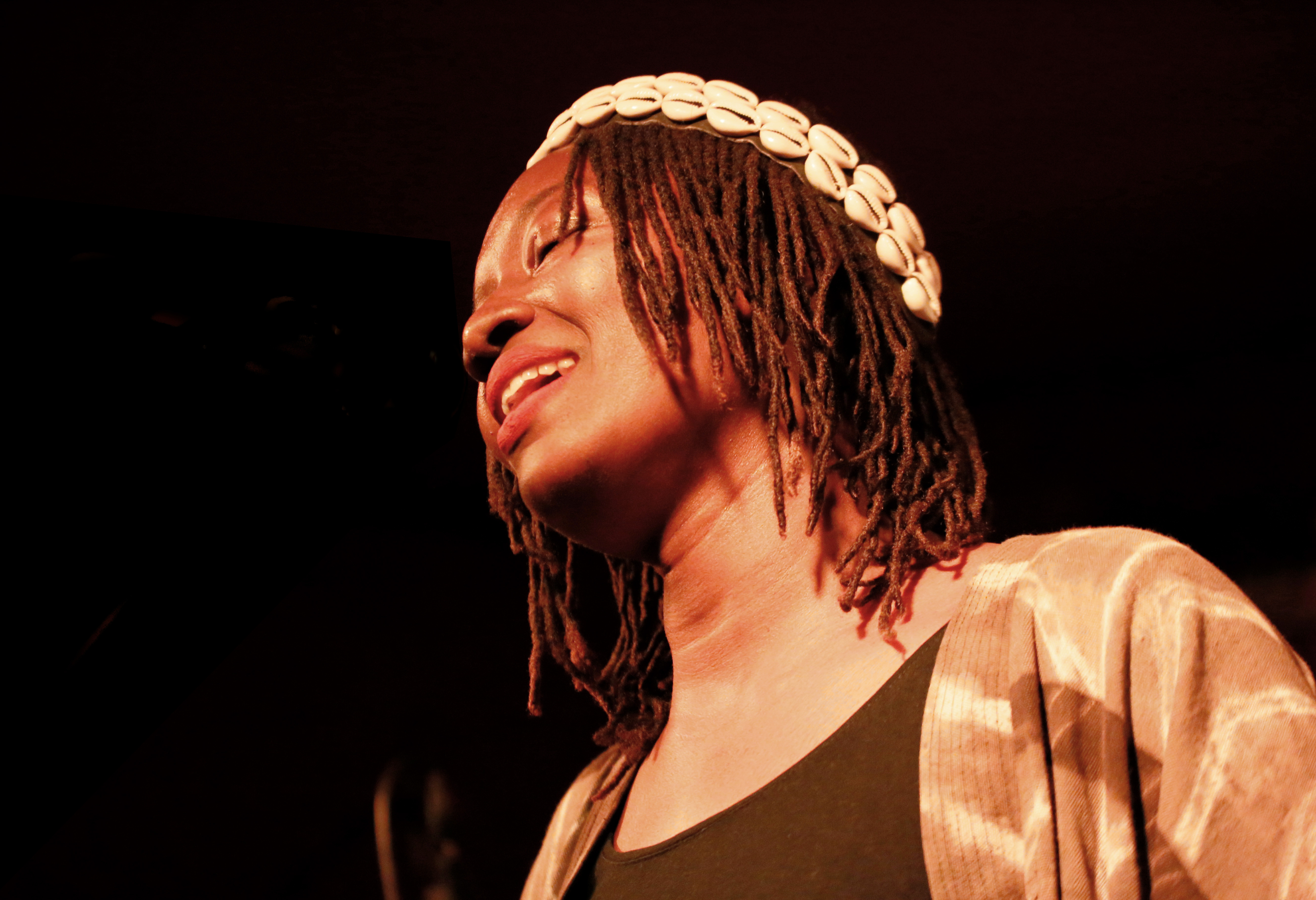
Mariam Kone

Mariam Koné (born April 1987 in Kati, Mali) is a Malian singer and music teacher and a member of the supergroup Les Amazones d'Afrique.

Koné has studied law, but she was swept away by music. In her teens, she joined the hip hop group Pacifique in her home town, releasing two albums with them. Later she studied music in the Bamako Conservatory, from which she graduated in 2011. She now teaches herself in this school.

Koné's first solo album Dakan was released in 2013. Its style is soft flowing traditional African pop, with dub influences and electric instrumentation. It was produced by the Irishman Liam Farrell a.k.a. Doctor L.

Koné was invited to Les Amazones d'Afrique by Pamela Badjoko, originally from Gabon but now residing in Mali. Koné was drawn to the group by the fact that it tries to further the cause of local women, opposing all kinds of violence against women, and especially female genital mutilation.

== Discography ==
- Mariam Koné: Dakan (2013)
- Oumou Sangare: Mogoya (2017)
- Les Amazones d'Afrique: République Amazone (2017)
- Omniversal Earkestra: Mali 70 (2020)
- Yemanjo feat. Mariam Koné: Kaniba (2022)
- Mariam Koné / Oliver Fox: Nouvelle Eau Dans La Riviere (2022)
- Bamako 42 Degrès - AC BC Project feat. Mariam Koné (2024)
- Yemanjo feat. Mariam Koné: Yamba (2025)

== Weblinks ==
- Mariam Koné on SoundCloud
- Mbokka Project: http://mp.afrikayna.com
- Oumou Sangare on Bandcamp
- Trikont Records on Bandcamp
- AC BC Project on Bandcamp
- Les Amazones d'Afrique on Bandcamp
- trndmsk on Bandcamp
