= Punu language =

Bantu language of Gabon and the Republic of Congo

Punu
- Yipunu
- Native to: Gabon, Republic of Congo
- Region: Central Africa
- Ethnicity: Punu
- Native speakers: 166,000 (2007)
- Language family: Niger–Congo?: Atlantic–Congo; Benue–Congo; Bantoid; Southern Bantoid; Bantu (Zone B); Sira; Punu

Language codes
- ISO 639-3: puu
- Glottolog: punu1239
- Guthrie code: B.43

Yipunu, also known as Yisira, is a Bantu language spoken in the Republic of Gabon and the Republic of Congo by several thousand people, mainly of the Punu and Ghisir ethnic groups, the largest of the four major ethnic groups in Gabon. Yipunu has about 120 thousand native speakers, mainly from the southern Region, including 8 thousand speakers in southern French Congo. It is classified as B.43 in the Guthrie classification.

== Phonology ==
=== Consonants ===
		Labial	Alveolar	Palatal	Velar
Plosive	voiceless	p	t		k
Plosive	voiced	b	d		(ɡ)
Plosive	prenasal vl.	ᵐp	ⁿt		ᵑk
Plosive	prenasal vd.	ᵐb	ⁿd		ᵑɡ
Affricate			t͡s	d͡ʒ	
Fricative	voiceless	f	s		
Fricative	voiced	β			ɣ
Fricative	prenasal	ᶬf	ⁿz		
Nasal		m	n	ɲ	
Rhotic			r		
Lateral			l		
Approximant		w		j	

- /ɣ/ can also be heard as [ɡ] in free variation.
- /ᶬf, ⁿz/ can also be heard as voiceless [ᶬv, ⁿs] in free variation.

=== Vowels ===
	Front	Central	Back
Close	i iː		u uː
Mid	e eː		o oː
Open		a aː	

- Vowels /a, e, o, eː, oː/ may also range to [ə, ɛ, ɔ, ɛː, ɔː].
- /i/ before sounds /u, w/ may be heard as an approximant [ɥ].

== Lexicon ==
Below is a lexicon from the "Parlons Yipunu", collected by Mabik-ma-Kombil.

A = he/she

Agunyi = where?

Agunenyi = who is it?

Agon = over there

Agunu = here (to here)

Amumu = in there

Amune = over there

Ani = who, which one?

Anàne = it's like that, that's it

Avene = there

Avave = here

Avenyi/Avè = where

Ba = they

Babàke = cut quickly

Babàse = fill quickly

Babile = to burn

Babule = flambé (an animal)

Bagule = find

Bagunu = to resemble

Bagusunu = find a resemblance

Bale = to ventilate, to clear away

Bali = day

Balile = shine

Bambige = to tighten

Bande = start

Bande = bottom

Bandebulongu = South

Bandekubu = lower abdomen

Bandige = to bend

Bandimine = to cover

Banganga = rootworkers

Banyigebibogu = May to June

Banze = turn on

Bare = to mount, to climb

Base = fill

Batile = to engulf, to swallow

Bé = forked tongue

Bebeli = very close to

Bèfule = to chip

Bège = carry, bring

Bèkule = initiate

Bele = to be sick

Beli = near, close to

Beluse = to heal

Bembe = touch

Bémbige = to rock, to console

Bèngusunu = going to meet a third party

Beruse = to bring down

Bète = to overthrow

Bètse = watching over a sick person

Biale = to be promoted

Bibeji = 2

Bige = to predict misfortune

Bike = miss, absent

Bikumbu = despicable behavior

Bikumbu = news

Bileli = a cry to implore

Bilongu = remedies, medicine

Bindige = lock

Bine = 4

Binge = pursue

Bingulu = bad habits

Birambi = suspicion

Biranu = 5

Birieri/Bitatu = 3

Bisiamunu = 6

Bisiemu = potions

Biswasu = speed

Bituti = dirty water

Bitoli = problems

Bivatile = stubbornness

Boke = kill

Bokise = losing a parent

Bole = pick up

Bonge = to take

Boti = good

Botse = to wet, soak

Bubitu = gums

Budige = to block, to obstruct a path

Budilu = iron

Budungu = to divine

Buji = honey

Buge = heal

Bukanyi = wickedness

Bukéti = skill

Bukongu = power

Bukulu = tradition

Bule = to break

Bulagu = madness

Bumbe = to shape

Bumbe = to kiss

Bundesti = babysitting

Bundumbe = authority, power, wealth

Bure = to give birth

Burele = hunting

Buse = refuse

Busine = wealth

Butambe = Earth

Buvèdi = teasing

Buvuandi = beauty

Bwage = throw

Bwagene = to lament in a group

Bwali = evil, disease

Bwange = to weave

Bwatu = canoe

Bwèjise = to make beautiful or good

Bwèle = to add

Bwile = to bathe

Dabule = withdraw

Dage = steal, theft

Dedi = similarly

Dédile = to obey

Dèkise = to pour drop by drop

Devise = nod of the head

Dibabe = mute

Dibage = knife

Dibaku = misstep

Dibale = man, male

Dibàle = umbrella

Dibàndu = beginning

Dibandu = game trap

Dibange = play

Dibagu = fever

Dibanzi = temple, place of initiatory worship

Dibéji = annoyance, mockery

Dibèri = drop (of water, blood, rain)

Dibi = bad deed

Dibufu = ash

Dibule = to open

Dibume = projectile

Dibundu = assembly

Difube = bulb

Difubu = hem

Difutu = old plantation

Difuitse = moss

Dige = kaolin, a clay mineral

Digale = coal

Digeru = actions of a baby

Digebu = wink

Digengi = abundance

Digobe = respect

Digogu = clay

Digosu = beverage mixed with breast milk

Diguki = heap

Digumbi = ship

Dijodigeyi = November to December

Dijodineni = January to February

Dikabu = part

Dikibise = teasing, annoyance

Dikimbe = initiatory badge

Dikongu = spear

Dikube = forge, blacksmith

Dikuku = bark

Dikule = to measure

Dikumbi = plane, rocket

Dikunde = dove

Dikundu = sorcery

Dikutu = pole

Dilàbuge = stopper

Dilambe = dance

Dilangi = drunkenness

Dilènze = insolence

Dilàgu = crazy

Dile = win, succeed

Dilongi = advice

Dilute = hole

Dimanyi = stone, pebble, rock

Dimbe = to hit

Dimbu = village

Dimengidiwisi = twilight

Dimi = pregnancy

Dimungi/Dungembi = fog

Dingènde = shriveled thing or person

Dingènze = truth, true thing

Dingibe = palm wine

Dingundu = hip

Dingungu = distinctive noise

Dinyiki = fly

Dingongu = metal box

Dinonge = friendship

Dinu = tooth

Dipaku = branch fork

Dipalulu = exit

Dipapi = bird's wing

Dirambe = swamp, marsh

Dirangi = booty cheek

Dironde = concubine

Dirugeme = sweat

Disabu = landing stage

Disale = dew

Disambeke = shoulder

Disambi = razor

Disàngu = lung

Disite = knot of a rope

Dissiere = epilepsy

Disonge = adultery

Disu = eye

Ditage = tadpole

Ditase = thought

Ditebugulu'diwisi = dawn

Ditéji = saliva

Ditèngu = returning

Ditodi = stain

Ditsange = tear

Ditsatselangi = audacity

Ditsutse = crest of a bird

Ditu = leech

Dituji = ear

Ditumbe = fight

Divare = good harvest

Divase = twin

Divembili = gust of wind with rain

Divènde = baldness

Divesi = flank, beside, on one side

Divilu = shaved head

Divesu = hate

Divite = war, fight

Divule = city

Divumbu = boil

Divuvu = throat

Diwavi = jealousy

Diwanzi = high forest of branches

Diwèle = marriage

Diweme = disobedience

Diwèru = hour

Dobule = to remove

Dodise = to comment

Dodimine = to examine

Doke = to pick

Dokimine = observe from afar

Dokule = to pick

Donze = deepen

Dore = to dream

Dubabele = stuttering

Dubambe = rattan, a plant used to make furniture

Dubile = pit

Dubongu = raffia fabric

Dufu = death

Dufunu = price

Dugaji = leaf

Dugane = scabies pustule, type of disease or infestation

Dugange = trap barrier

Dugélu = gossip

Dugongi = eyelash

Dugoru = toad

Dugugeme = stuttering

Dugunge = flat rock slab

Dugungu = imprecatory insult

Duguve = animal tick

Duke = follow

Dukabonu = pangolin

Dukande = insomnia

Dukonduku/Dilobe = hook

Dukuji = flying squirrel

Dulombili = village square, courtyard

Dumbulu = green

Dumise = glorify, boast

Dumuge = jump, leap

Dumwènu = mirror

Dunangu = pride

Dunangu = talk in a loud, aggressive manner with little effect

Dungwène = chameleon

Dure = drink

Duru = spoon

Durundu = red fruit

Dusale = feather

Dusambu = prayer

Dusavu = tale, fable

Dusongu = point

Dusosu = splinter

Dusugi = hawk

Dusièndi = thorn

Dute = to shoot

Dutsi = sneeze

Dutsole = scissors

Duvèsi = cockroach

Dwale = nail, claw

Dwèngu = pot

Fife = to suck

Fike = drink by filtering the liquid between the teeth

Fube = mix

Fuge = cut hair

Fumu'Nzambi/Fumunzambi = God, supreme being

Funde = accuse, denounce

Funde = digging

Fundu = confabulation

Fure = to lie

Fute = pay, spit

Fwale = France

Fwate = go through the small bush

Fwèngilile = to slander, to accuse unjustly

Fwère = to draw, to pick up

Fwimbe = share unequally

Fwinyi = tighten by pulling

Fwiri = boredom, annoyance

Gabe = to share

Gabuge = to return

Gabuse = to give back

Gake = to bite

Galene = to dispute an object

Game = squeeze, wring

Gamuge = to shout

Gandise = to prohibit

Gànge = to catch, seize

Gange = fry, roast

Gari = in the middle of

Gariwisi = midnight

Gebule = to wink, to step

Getubulongu = West

Gobise = respect

Gobule = to spit out

Golile = to wash, to rub oil

Golule = to shell, to tear

Gome = fear, dread

Gombe = to scrape, scrape

Gonge = bypass

Gore = to warm up

Gorule = to scratch

Gubene = to hit

Gubule = dust, brush

Gudige = return

Gufise = to shorten

Gukulile = to imitate, to reproduce

Gulu = ancient, old

Gulu = to hear, to listen

Gumbe = moan, roar, growl

Gumbe = to cover, surround

Gumbesne = to kiss, to embrace

Gumuse = to dry

Ibalu = tree bark

Ibambe = white man

Ibadu = clan

Ibedu = sick

Ibinde = bad luck

Ibindi = corpse, remains

Ibonge = turtle

Ibotsi = rot

Iburu = parent

Ibusi = sister

Idibutsu = lid

Idube = net

Idume = danger

Idumbitsi = shadow

Idumi = thunderclap

Idumuimfule = tornado

Idune = hole, cavity, cavern

Idwaru = garment

Ifu = 9

Ifufu = crumb, poor

Ifulu = steam bath

Ifwale = French language

Ifwinzi = poultry crop

Igabe = punch

Igare = crate, trunk, suitcase

Igume = speech, word

Igumi/Digumi = 10

Igungule'tubi = flooding of a river

Ikadi = bridge

Ikaji = corpse

Ikambi = performer

Ikari = fall

Ikémbi = dwarf

Ikènzi = cricket

Ikibe = shortness of breath

Ikoku = bump

Ikoku = dance of rejoicing

Ikotige = penknife

Ikoyi = disabled, paraplegic

Ikuku = cooking

Ikumbu = fine

Ilange = elephant trunk

Ilèke = source, origin

Ileme = time, moment

Ilengi = child

Ilibe = oblivion, nothingness

Ilime = year

Ilimbe = mark

Ilindi = raft

Ilinge = cassock, robe

Ilingilingi = the center of the world

Ilombi = short story

Ilumbi = message

Ilumbu = day

Ilunge = earring

Image = supernatural event

Imomonyi = firefly

Imosi = 1

Inane = 8

Inde = will-o'-the-wisp

Ingange = church

Ingidi = small xylophone

Ingume = sterile

Inombu = troop, herd

Inyunyi = soul, spirit

Inunu = elder, old man

Ipèle = plate

Ipunge = bat

Ipupu = peeling

Irèle = size

Irèndi = piece of cloth

Irure = vial

Isage = cluster of fruits

Isalu = work, profession, task

Isambwali = 7

Isange = jug, jar

Isangomu = letter

Isindu = pollarded tree trunk

Isinge = grass

Isinzi = pointed stump

Isièmu = remedies

Isièngu = insult

Isièyi = sand

Isombule = way of wearing the loincloth

Isonyi = shame

Isupu = sheath

Isusube = bladder

Iswasu = cold

Iswisu = staring

Itale = smokehouse

Itande = market

Itengi = mask, shard, shell

Itsatse = caterpillar

Itsibe = deep water

Itsige = seat, bed

Itsubi = rainy season

Itumbe = image, engraving, statue

Itunzi = stupid

Itutu = bulrush torch

Ivaru = plant

Ivele = fast

Iviovi = hat, cap

Jabe = to know

Ji = to eat

Jibe = gluttony

Julunzambi/Julu'nzambi = sky

Kabu = anger

Kafi = paddle

Kage = grandfather, grandmother

Kaki = lightning

Kale = crab

Kambe = missing something

Kange = guinea fowl

Kangi = fire

Katsi = maternal uncle

Kédi = morning

Kégèngi = fresh

Kekigangi/Igangi = short dry season

Kekitsubi = short rainy season

Kèle = to wait

Kèlise = to keep

Kibe = to cover

Kibise = to annoy, to tease

Kile = to iron

Kingu = neck

Kobi = bag

Kobige = to hang

Kokolu = sorry

Kondini = in vain, uselessly

Kôngu = jar, clay jug

Kongu = river antelope

Kosi = effigy or statue of a deity

Kote = to enter

Kotise = to bring in

Kugumfu = dust

Kuke = to sow

Kumbu = motto, mantra

Kunge = copper

Kuñi = deprivation of meat

Kuru = armpit

Kute = to surround

Kuteme = to kneel

Kwalele = crosses

Kwé/Kwényi = how much?

Labe = see Lage = to sow

Lambe = to cook

Lambi = lamp

Lege = to spy

Lèle = rocking, caressing, raising a child

Lelévi = full, brim

Lélige = to take, to suspend

Lémbige = to console, to soothe

Lèmbule = apply oil on an abscess, caress

Lènde = to beg

Lènze = to despise

Lengule = examine contemplate

Leve = make an oath

Lile = to cry

Linge = traveling

Lobe = fish

Lobuge = to step over, to cross

Loge = bewitch, curse

Lubuge = to be clever, cunning, shrewd

Lúge = vomit

Luge = name

Lukule = to complete

Longe = teach, promise

Mabale = right

Mabufu = ashes

Madibe = deafness

Madudumbi = clouds

Madungu = hernia

Mafinyi = pus

Magetu = left

Magunde = century, millennium

Make = sap

Makengi = slime

Makibu = pledge

Makiele = dawn

Malamu = palm wine

Malémbi = hug

Malu = confluent, coming together of rivers

Malumbi = praise to the ancestors

Malungu = blood

Mambe = water

Mambi = shit

Mane = finish

Mange = snack

Mangele = dry season

Mapémi = threats

Marangi/Dirangi = booty

Masige = yesterday

Masuku = claps

Mate = to rise, to climb

Matsi = oil

Mbàlebulongu = East

Mbari = palm tree

Mbatsi = friend, comrade

Mbèle = wrong

Mbémbu = voice

Mbèngi = ravine, precipice

Mbingu = food

Mbugu = mouthful

Mbùnge = crab shell

Mbunge = smell

Mbwélili = star

Mengu = sharp

Mfubu = hippopotamus

Mfule = rain

Mfumbi = deceased

Mfunge = to wrap oneself in a loincloth

Mfwange = news of death

Milolu = cries of joy

Minzi = wolf-dog

Mobutsi = savior

Monyu = life

Moru = ring

Mubeji = 2nd

Mubiji = wave

Mubu = sea, ocean

Mudodu = balance

Mufu = 9th

Mufune = load

Mufundu = complaint

Mugamu = cry, howl

Mugumi = 10th

Mukate = skin

Mukolu = night

Mukongu = hill, mountain

Mukube = blacksmith

Mukùbe = beak

Mukubi = malevolence

Mukwati = machete

Mukwili = widower, widow

Mule = blessing

Mulingu = journey

Mulumi = husband

Mulutso = flame

Mumbèngu = small canoe

Mumbinge = stilt

Munaji = strophanthus poison

Munane = 8th

Munangasunge = praying mantis

Mundumbe = notable, renown

Mungongu = musical bow

Mungudi = tornado, whirlwind

Munombi = black man

Mupande = braid

Mupume = year

Muranu = 5th

Murèle = hunter

Murieru = 3rd

Murondu = eel

Musabu = insolence

Musambwali = 7th

Musamu = short story

Musande = umbrella

Musiamunu = 6th

Musini = eyebrow

Musiru = forest

Musoli = fallow field

Musolu = job, work

Musongu = disease

Musoñi = flesh, meat

Musuge = permission

Musulu = boiled

Musungu = sugar cane

Musièngi = large village

Mutu = person, human

Muvedi = scar is

Muvèmbe = albino

Muvige = slave

Muvumu = breathing

Muweli = month

Muyame = rainbow

Muyombu = perfume

Mwaji = brother-in-law

Mwane = child

Mwényi = visitor, stranger

Mwètse = moonlight

Mwine = 4th

Mwinzi = filth, dirt

Na = with

Nane = massage

Nangule = to lift

Ndami = comrade, friend

Ndagu = hut, house

Ndétsi = child's rocker

Ndige = bait

Ndike = small fish basket

Ndilu = limit, border

Nimbe = colour

Ndele = a song which signifies an exchange between the living and the ancestors

Ndunge = reason

Nemise = to hurt

Nènge = to learn

Nèngile = to call

Nesi = no

Ngande = courtyard, village square

Ngangakosi = rootworker who traps sorcerers

Ngange/Nganga = traditional healer

Ngènge = centipede

Ngo = panther, leopard

Ngomfi = harp

Ngombu = raffia

Ngondi = flower

Ngunge = bell

Ngusu = jealousy

Ngwangu = stick

Nongu = proverb, parable

Nwane = to borrow

Nyangu = Sun

Nza = then

Nzale = hunger

Nzile = path

Nzime = back

Nzobu = civet

Nzontsi = judge

Nzoruru = filth

Nzumbili = smoke

Nzwingiri = dragonfly

Page = resin

Pake = to square

Pale = exit

Pambuge = to wander

Pari = pristine forest

Pase = split

Patula = to tear off

Pembi = kaolin mineral

Penge = chin

Pèni = nudity

Pinde = black

Pinze = alone, loneliness

Pitse = to weigh

Pube = mat

Pugu = be patient

Punge = wind

Puni = murderer, thief who robs & kills in forests & mountains

Pupe = spray, sprinkle

Pupe = move

Puve = echo

Pwanyi = width, breadth

Pwasese = interval

Pwele = many

Pwiti = hole, crevice

Rabile = to burn and leave a wound, to bite

Rakule = to snatch

Range = read

Rangemine = to remember

Rarige = to sew

Régeme: tremble, shiver

Rine = flee, run away

Riri = red

Rombe = to search

Ronde = love

Riabe = to cut (dead wood)

Sabi = key

Sakulebibogu = March to April

Sale = to work

Sàle = choose

Sambile = to pray

Sàmbule = to present

Sanze = to drive out, to expel

Save = desire

Sàve = to tell, talk about, denounce

Sibe = to sharpen

Sige = to play an instrument

Sike = to stall

Simbe = to greet

Sindige = to send

Sindile = to push

Singisile = to congratulate

Sobene = to mix

Sole = clear

Sopene = exchange

Sube = to urinate

Sumbe = buy, pay

Sumbise = to sell

Sumune = to defy a prohibition

Sundile = suddenly

Sunduge = go down

Sungesene = to oppose, parallel

Suse = wash

Swèkige = to strangle

Sweme = to hide

Tabule = break, cut

Takule = start walking

Tale = count

Tali = block of stone

Tandige = to align

Tandubulongu = North

Tapele = insolence

Tase = to think

Tate = dad, father

Tate = to express pain

Tege = 1st

Time = dig

Timbuge = bend, be erect

Tinde = to send

Tsakule = to insult

Tsande = loincloth

Tsige = to bury

Tsimbu = to make a mistake

Tsindule = erase, wipe, dust

Tsingule = to say, to confess

Tsisige = evening, afternoon

Tsoke = to prick

Tsoli = bird

Tsone = week

Tsongi = needle

Tsugu = prison

Tsumbi = September to October

Tsune = to watch

Tsunde = to discuss

Tsungi/Ngonde = Moon

Tsungule = to hurt

Tsuve = calabash

Tuge = surety, pledge

Tumbe = flying fast

Tumune = attack, provoke

Tute = to accumulate, to amass

Va = there is

Vage = to do

Vale = far

Vale = to cut

Vande = spiritual artifacts

Vànde = to make mats, to braid

Vàne = to pay, to reimburse

Vare = to plant

Vate = to be stubborn

Vatsi = on the ground

Vagusu = in front

Vege = give

Veme = white, whiteness

Vend = lick

Vèngutse = except

Vère = to shoot a gun

Veve = split

Viluge = to bloom

Vine = to hate

Viri = very, intensity

Vive = wait

Vole = smoking

Vombulu = open

Vonde = ask

Vondinivondini = nonchalantly

Vonu = very thin

Vose = speak, say

Vove = to chat

Vule = to undress, become nude

Vume = to breathe

Vunge = zero, nothing

Vuse = to spread, to exhale

Wabe = to fish

Wabule = take food out of a pot

Wake = to receive

Wale = to extend

Walule = tell a dream

Wamuse = to help

Wanzemwanzu = village chief

Wèle = to marry

Wélige = try, compare

Wème = to disobey

Wimbile = to sing

Wisi = time

Wivule = to ask

Yabutsu = door

Yangele = thirst

Yanzule = filter, sieve

Yari = side

Yasi = slice

Yélu = measure

Yévi = basket

Yèse = luck

Yisasaku = July to August

Yotsi = cold

Yusile = heat

== See also ==
- Rimba language
