= Musow Danse =

Studio album by Les Amazones d'Afrique
- Released: 16 February 2024
- Genre: Electropop; funk; folk
- Length: 39:03
- Label: Real World
- Producer: Jacknife Lee

Les Amazones d'Afrique chronology
Amazones Power (2020)	Musow Danse (2024)

Musow Danse is the third studio album by West African collective Les Amazones d'Afrique, released on 16 February 2024 through Real World Records. It was produced by Jacknife Lee and includes vocals from Mamani Keïta, Dobet Gnahoré, Nneka, Alvie Bitemo, Fafa Ruffino, and Kandy Guira. The album received acclaim from critics.

== Critical reception ==
Professional ratings
Aggregate scores
Source	Rating
Metacritic	86/100
Review scores
Source	Rating
Mojo	4/5 stars
PopMatters	9/10
Uncut	8/10

Musow Danse received a score of 86 out of 100 on review aggregator Metacritic based on four critics' reviews, indicating "universal acclaim". Uncut stated that "the songs are rich in both melody and syncopation", while Mojo commented that "there are 808s and sensory synths galore, but it's the powerful message and those voices – tough soulful leads and contrastingly sweet gospel harmonies – that hold sway here". Adriane Pontecorvo of PopMatters stated that "the energy is as vital as ever as the group continues to celebrate womanhood over some of their most engaging beats to date", also calling it "a brilliant third installation in the Les Amazones d'Afrique discography thus far".

Rolling Stone's Chinonso Ihekire wrote that "the album seduces with glee, setting soothing traditional harmonies atop varied tempos, feeling more dynamic and cohesive than the group's previous albums in its embrace of electro-pop, funk, and folk fusions". Ihekire also felt that "the balance of sonic opposites on Musow Danse is a huge part of the album's appeal".

== Track listing ==
Musow Danse track listing
No.	Title	Length
1.	"Musow Danse (Women's Dance)"	3:31
2.	"Mother Murakoze" (featuring Alvie Bitemo)	3:13
3.	"Flaws" (featuring Mamani Keïta and Fafa Ruffino)	3:05
4.	"Kiss Me" (featuring Dobet Gnahoré)	3:35
5.	"Kuma Fo (What They Say)"	3:36
6.	"Espérance" (featuring Mamani Keïta)	3:03
7.	"To Be Loved" (featuring Kandy Guira)	3:04
8.	"Queen Kuruma" (featuring Fafa Ruffino)	3:17
9.	"Bobo Me (Interlude)" (featuring Nneka)	1:32
10.	"Amahoro (Don't Get Angry)" (featuring Alvie Bitemo)	3:40
11.	"My Place" (featuring Dobet Gnahore)	4:15
12.	"Bobo Me" (featuring Nneka and Mamani Keïta)	3:12
Total length:		39:03
