= Bongo people (Gabon) =

Ethnic group in Gabon

The Bongo people, also called Babongo or Bazimba, are an agricultural people of Gabon in equatorial Africa who are known as "forest people" due to their recent foraging economy.

The name originates, respectfully, in consideration of Mbenga Pygmies, though they are not particularly short. They are originators of the Bwiti religion, based on consumption of the intoxicating hallucinogenic iboga plant.

There is no one Bongo language. They speak the languages of their Bantu neighbors, with some dialectical differentiation due to their distinct culture and history; among these are Tsogo (the Babongo-Tsogho), Nzebi (the Babongo-Nzebi), West Téké (the Babongo-Iyaa), and Lumbu (the Babongo-Gama), and Myene (the Babongo-Akoa). Yasa in Gabon is reportedly spoken by "Pygmies"; Yasa-speakers speak a different language than their patrons, unlike any other group in Gabon apart from the Baka. The Barimba, Bagama, and Akoa live in the southern coastal provinces.

Bahuchet (2006) confirms three languages, each with dialectical differentiation from their non-Pygmy speakers: Tsogho in the central region (living with the Akele, Tsogo, Simba, Sango, Sira), and Teke and Kaning'i in the southeast (living among the Akele, Ka, ningi, Teke, Wumbu and the Obamba, Teke, respectively).

The Rimba variety of Massango, however, has recently (2010) reported to have a core of non-Niger–Congo words and therefore should be considered unclassified.

The Babongo have recently changed from being nomadic hunter-gatherers to settled villagers with subsistence agriculture supplemented by hunting. In the early 20th century they were fully nomadic and physically distinct from their Bantu neighbors, but by the mid 20th century they were starting to settle and to become physically indistinguishable. They have radio but not television in their small village communities and the few metal implements they possess come from the outside world. They are otherwise self-sufficient in their villages.
