= SeBa =

Gabonese singer

Seba Charmelle Scholastique
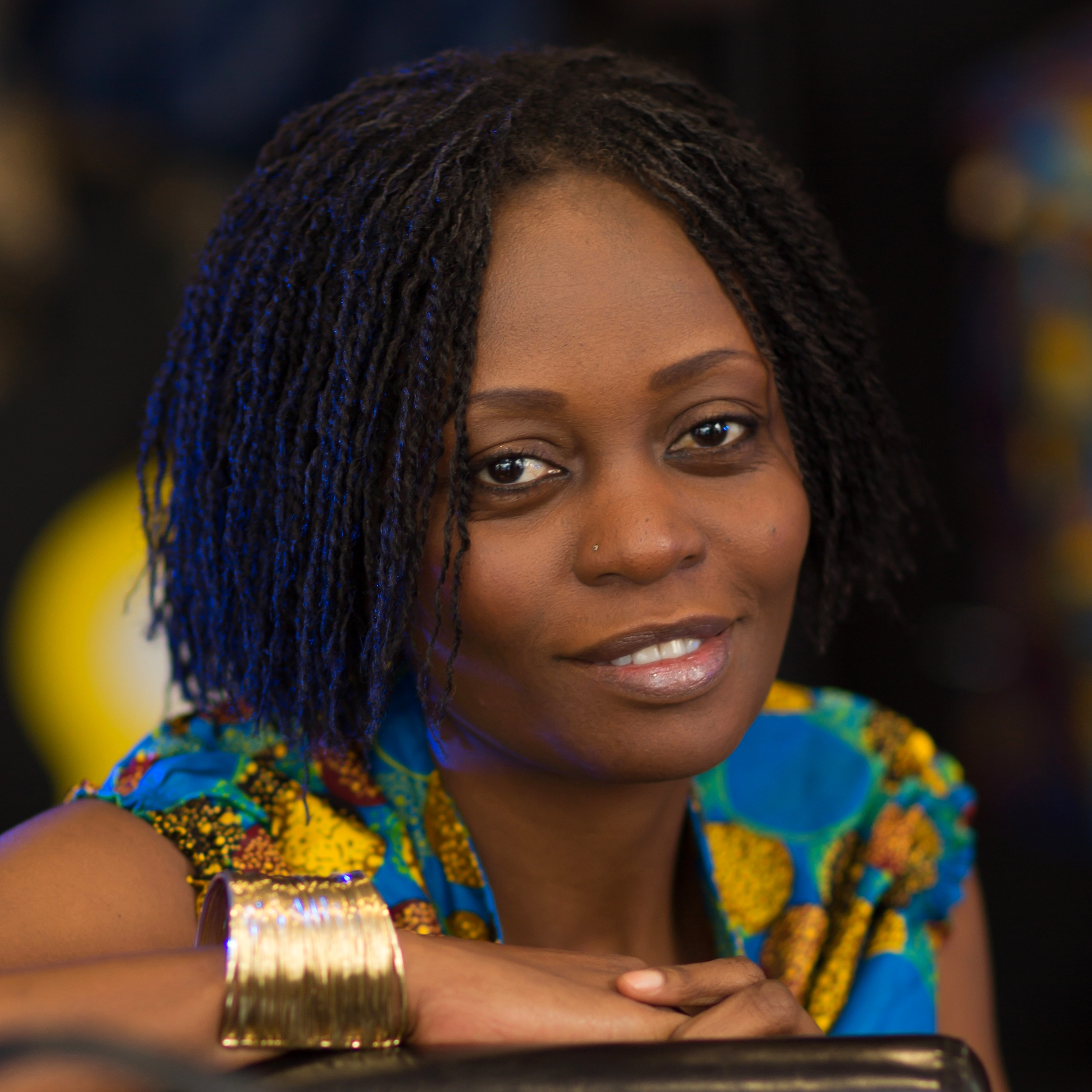
- Born: April 12, 1973 (age 52); Koulamoutou
- Other names: SeBa
- Occupation: Singer

Seba Charmelle Scholastique known as SeBa (born April 12, 1973) is a Gabonese singer. She sings in the Nzebi language, but it is her use of Italian that gained her a knighthood. She has published several albums since her first in 2006.

== Life ==
She was born in Koulamoutou in 1973. She started writing music after she joined a choir when she was twelve.

Her graduate studies were in Italy where she continued her interest in singing by joining a choir in the Vatican.

Her album Kundu was recorded in France and Gabon after years of planning. She writes and sings her songs in the Njebi language and they were sung on that album.

In Libreville, she works as a chorister with Pierre Akendengué and they who recorded for Pierre Barouh in 1974. She joined Chant sur la Lowé, a Gabonese choir. That choir was the runner up in the first Choral Singing Olympiads in 2000 in Linz and in 2013 they were the guest choir at the Choralies festival in Vaison-la-Romaine. SeBa would take the solo of his composition Ngonga Nzembi.

On 2 June 2018 the Italian ambassador to Gabon, Paolo De Nicolo, celebrated the 72nd anniversary of the founding of the republic of Italy by making an award to SeBa. In recognition of her work in the Italian language in Gabon, she was made a Knight of the Order of the Star of Italy.
