= Culture of Gabon =

The Gabonese people have forged since the independence of the country, in 1960, their own culture which is neither the traditional culture of the different ethnic groups which compose it, nor modern Western culture. It is a culture in movement, a mixture of diversity and common traits, bringing together the most diverse beliefs and practices.

== Music ==
Gabonese music is little-known in comparison with regional giants like the Democratic Republic of the Congo and Cameroon. The country boasts an array of folk styles, as well as pop stars like Patience Dabany and Annie-Flore Batchiellilys, a Gabonese singer and renowned live performer.

Dabany's albums, though recorded in Los Angeles, have a distinctively Gabonese element and are popular throughout Francophone Africa. Other major musicians include Pierre-Claver Akendengue (considered a master-poet), "the veteran" Mack Joss, Vickos Ekondo, known as "the king of Tandima".

Annie Flore has participated in musical events, both improvised and planned, with a wide variety of musicians from around the world, including: Youssou N'dour (Senegal), Ray Lema (DRC), Lokua Kanza (DRC), La Baronne (France), Carlo Rizzo (Italy), Cynthia Scott (USA), Mario Chenart (Canada), Solange Campagne (Canada), Philip Peris (Australia) and Qiu-Xia-He (China).

Also known are guitarists like Georges Oyendze, La Rose Mbadou and Sylvain Avara, and the singer Oliver N'Goma. Imported rock and hip hop from the US and UK are popular in Gabon, as are rumba, makossa and soukous. Gabonese folk instruments include the obala, the ngombi, balafon and traditional drums.

== Literature and oral tradition ==
A country with a primarily oral tradition up until the spread of literacy in the 21st century, Gabon is rich in folklore and mythology. "Raconteurs" are currently working to keep traditions alive such as the mvett among the Fangs and the ingwala among the Nzebis.

== Masks ==
Gabon also features internationally celebrated masks, such as the n'goltang (Fang) and the reliquary figures of the Kota. Each group has its own set of masks used for various reasons. They are mostly used in traditional ceremonies such as marriage, birth and funerals. Traditionalists mainly work with rare local woods and other precious materials.

Masks are also used for masked stilt-dancing, which is widespread across cultures in Western and Central Africa, from Liberia to Tanzania. Within Gabon, the BaNdzabi people of the Ogooué River basin perform such dances. Masked dances, whether on stilts or not, rely on complex drum rhythms that are generally considered difficult for outsiders to follow. The multiple rhythmic meters have been argued to be an artistic reflection of the belief, at least among the Fang people, that life is about opposition and duality.

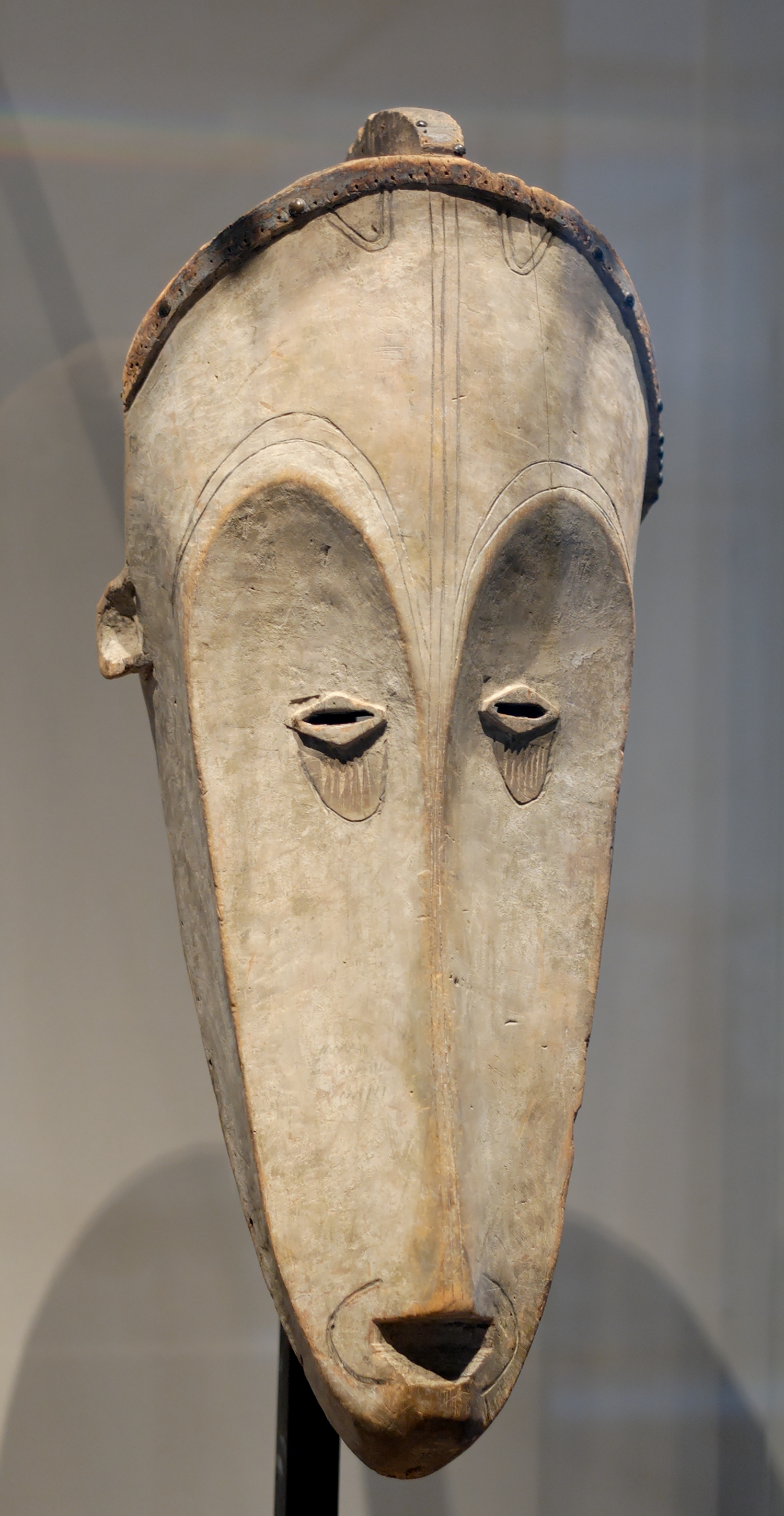
Fang mask used for the ngil ceremony. Wood, 19th century

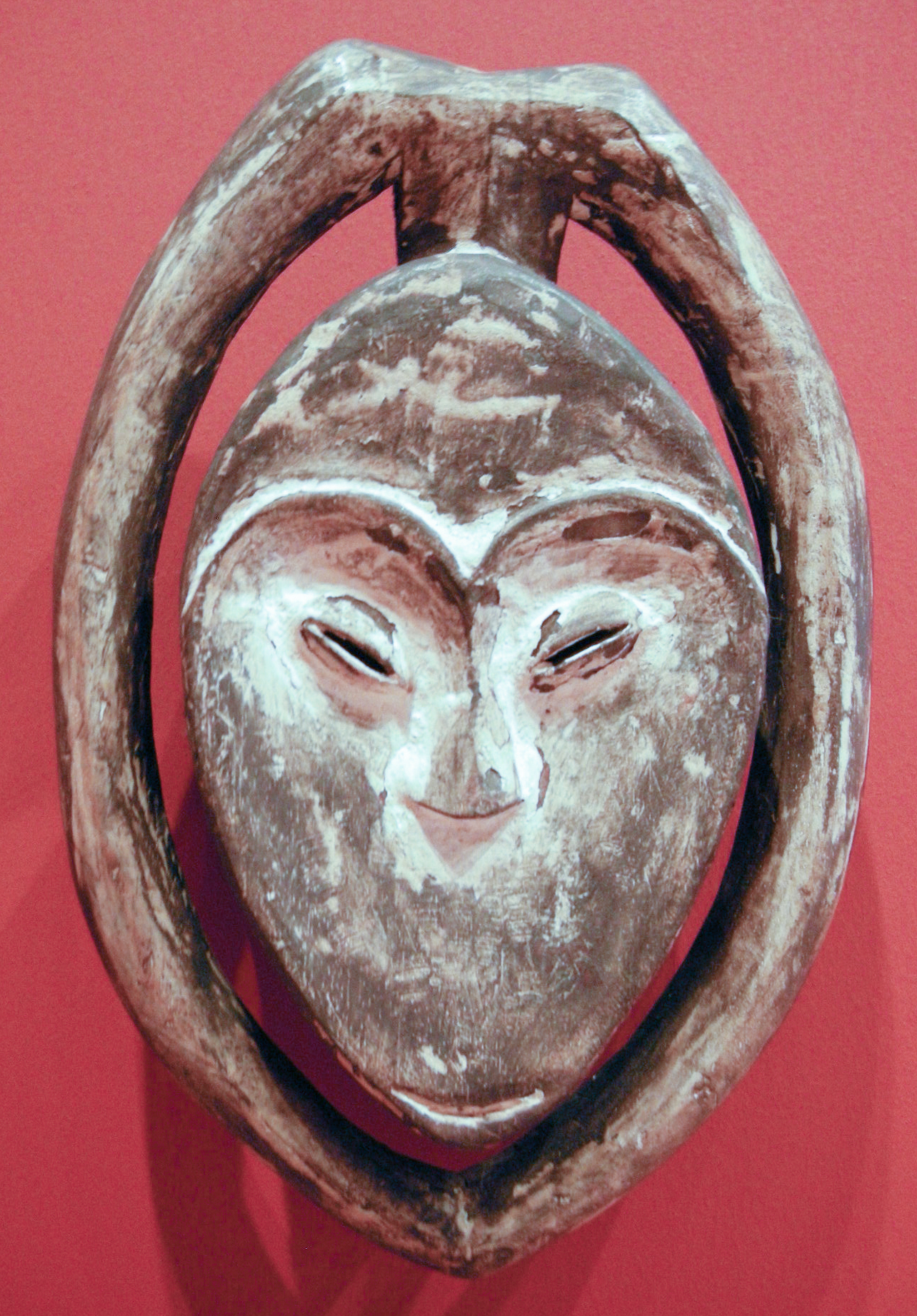
Bdembo ritual mask

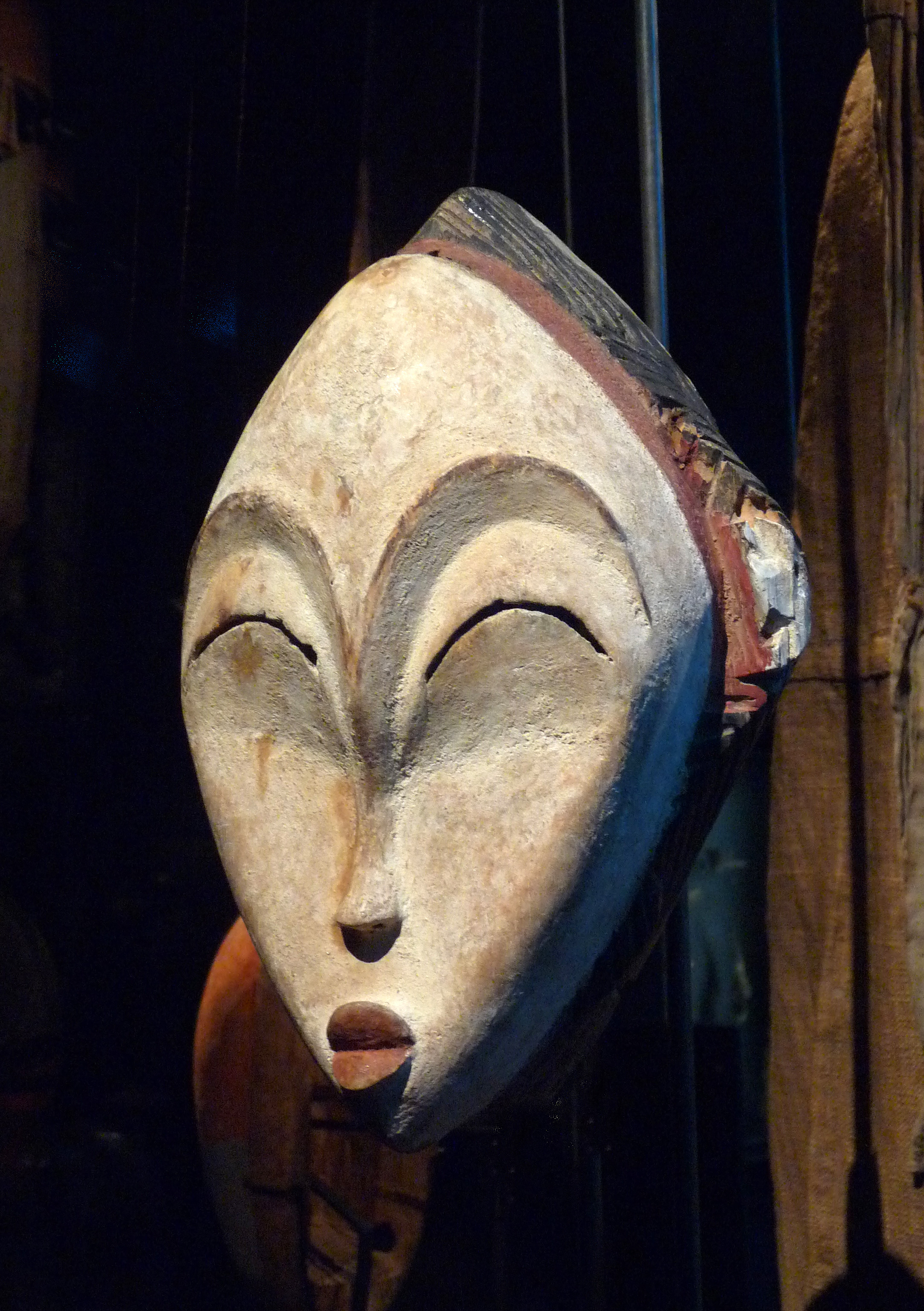
Punu white mask

== See also ==
- List of Gabonese films
- Ethnic groups in Gabon
- Languages of Gabon
- Religion in Gabon
