= Les Amazones d'Afrique =

Malian contemporary world music supergroup

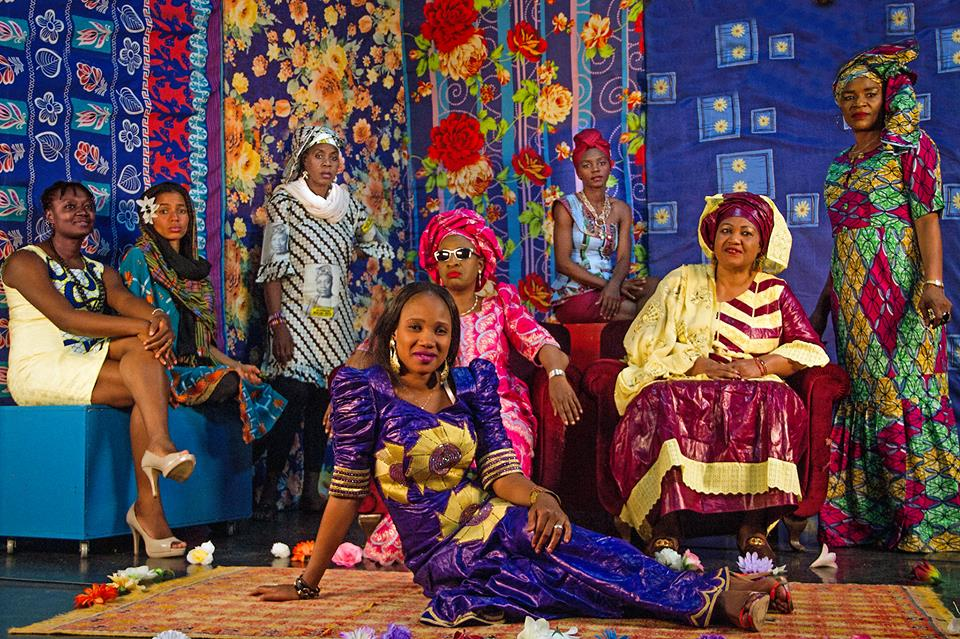
- Les Amazones d'Afrique during the recording of their album République Amazone in Bamako, Mali in 2016.

Background information
- Origin: Mali, Benin, Gabon, Nigeria, Guinea, France, Algeria, Ivory Coast
- Genres: World music
- Years active: 2015–present
- Labels: Real World
- Members: Mamani Keïta; Rokia Koné; Fafa Ruffino; Kandy Guira; Niariu; Nacera Ouali Mesbah; Ami Yerewolo; Jon Grace; Boy Fall; Adeola Soyemi
- Past members: Kandia Kouyaté; Angélique Kidjo; Mariam Doumbia; Nneka; Mariam Koné; Massan Coulibaly; Madina N'Diaye; Madiaré Dramé; Mouneissa Tandina; Pamela Badjogo; Oumou Sangaré; Awa Sangho; Babani Koné
- Website: lesamazonesdafrique.com

Les Amazones d'Afrique (English: 'The Amazons of Africa') is a contemporary world music supergroup formed in Mali in 2015 featuring Kandia Kouyaté, Angélique Kidjo, Mamani Keita, Rokia Koné, Mariam Doumbia (of Amadou & Mariam), Nneka, Mariam Koné, Massan Coulibaly, Madina N'Diaye, Madiaré Dramé, Mouneissa Tandina and Pamela Badjogo. The name of the group refers to the Dahomey Amazons, which was a female elephant hunting group and a military regiment from the 17th century through the 19th century in what is now Benin.

Les Amazones d'Afrique performed their first concert at Fiesta des Suds in Marseilles in October 2015. The first track they released was "I Play the Kora", a track that goes well beyond the often-reductive term of "world music". Its message is to encourage women coming together to sing about why they should "rise up and fight injustice because we're all equal", and profits from the sale of the track are donated to The Panzi Foundation, led by Doctor Mukwege in Bukavu (DRC), which has provided healing support to more than 80,000 women, nearly 50,000 of whom are victims of sexualised violence and female genital mutilation. The kora, a harp-like instrument native to West Africa, works as a metaphor: playing the kora was denied to women for years; only men were allowed the prestige.

Following their first UK performance at WOMAD Charlton Park in July 2016, Les Amazones d'Afrique were signed to Real World Records for the release of their first album, Republique Amazone (2017).

== Discography ==
- République Amazone (2017)
- Amazones Power (2020)
- Musow Danse (2024)
