= Myene people =

Myene
Regions with significant populations
- Gabon (Estuaire and Ogooué-Maritime province)

Languages
- Myene, French

Religion
- Christianity (Roman Catholicism, Protestantism), Bantu religion

Related ethnic groups
- Fang people, Kota people, other Bantu peoples

The Myene people are an ethnic group indigenous to the coastal regions of Gabon, in Central Africa. They are one of the smaller Bantu-speaking groups in the country but hold historical significance due to their early contact with European traders and explorers during the Atlantic trade era. Traditionally fishermen, traders, and skilled artisans, the Myene have played a notable role in the cultural and economic history of Gabon.

== History ==
The Myene are considered one of the earliest Bantu groups to settle in the coastal areas of what is now Gabon, arriving through a series of migrations that began several centuries ago. By the 15th century, when Portuguese explorers first reached the region, Myene-speaking communities were already well established along the coast and river estuaries.

== Language ==
The Myene speak several closely related dialects collectively known as the Myene languages, part of the wider Bantu family. Some of these dialects include Mpongwe, Orungu, Nkomi, and Akele. Today, many Myene people are bilingual, speaking both their native languages and French, Gabon’s official language.

== Culture ==
Social Organization

Traditionally, Myene society was organized into clans and villages led by chiefs. Lineage and inheritance were often traced through the maternal line, a common feature among many Bantu groups.

== Religion ==
Prior to the spread of Christianity, the Myene practiced indigenous religions centered around ancestor worship, nature spirits, and complex cosmologies involving a creator deity. Today, most Myene identify as Christians (primarily Roman Catholic or Protestant), though traditional beliefs and practices often persist alongside Christianity.

== Art and craftsmanship ==
The Myene are known for their intricate woodworking, particularly the carving of canoes and ceremonial masks. Their artistic styles have influenced broader Gabonese art traditions, especially in sculpture and mask-making.

== Demographics ==
The Myene population is relatively small compared to larger Gabonese groups like the Fang. They are primarily concentrated in the Estuaire and Ogooué-Maritime provinces, particularly around cities such as Libreville and Port-Gentil. Many Myene have also migrated to urban areas for education and employment opportunities.

== Notable figures ==
- Louis-Gabriel-Rochon (19th century) – a prominent Myene trader and intermediary during early French colonial expansion.
- André Raponda-Walker (1871–1968) – a notable Myene priest, scholar, and ethnographer whose works preserved much knowledge about Gabonese traditions and languages.

== See also ==
- Gabonese culture
- Bantu peoples
- History of Gabon
