= Pamela Badjogo =

Afro-Jazz musician from Gabon

- Born: 3 December 1982 (age 43)
- Genres: World music
- Occupations: Musician, Singer
- Instruments: Voice, Guitar
- Formerly of: Les Amazones d'Afrique
- Website: https://www.pamelabadjogo.net/

Pamela Badjogo (born 3 December 1982) is an Afro-Jazz musician from Gabon and a former member of Les Amazones d'Afrique.

== Early life ==
Badjogo was born in Libreville, Gabon on 3 December 1982, as a child she was a chorister at her church. Shemoved to Bamako, Mali, in 2005 on a scholarship to study malaria.

== Career ==
Whilst living in Bamako, Badjogo began singing and recording in studios and collaborating with French producer Manjul. In 2007, Badjogo was a finalist in the first edition of the musical reality show Case Sanga on Africable, winning the semi-final against the artist Cheick Siriman Cissoko. In 2015 Bajogo crowd-funded her first solo album Mes Couleurs. In 2017 she performed at the closing ceremony for the Africa Cup of Nations.

Badjogo moved to Lyons in 2017 to work on a new musical project with artists from Perigord. On February 15, 2019, Pamela Badjogo performed in Lyon during the One Night for 2,500 Voices event at the Palais de la Mutualité in Lyon, a charity evening which aimed to raise funds for the benefit of research against paediatric cancer.

=== Les Amazones d'Afrique ===
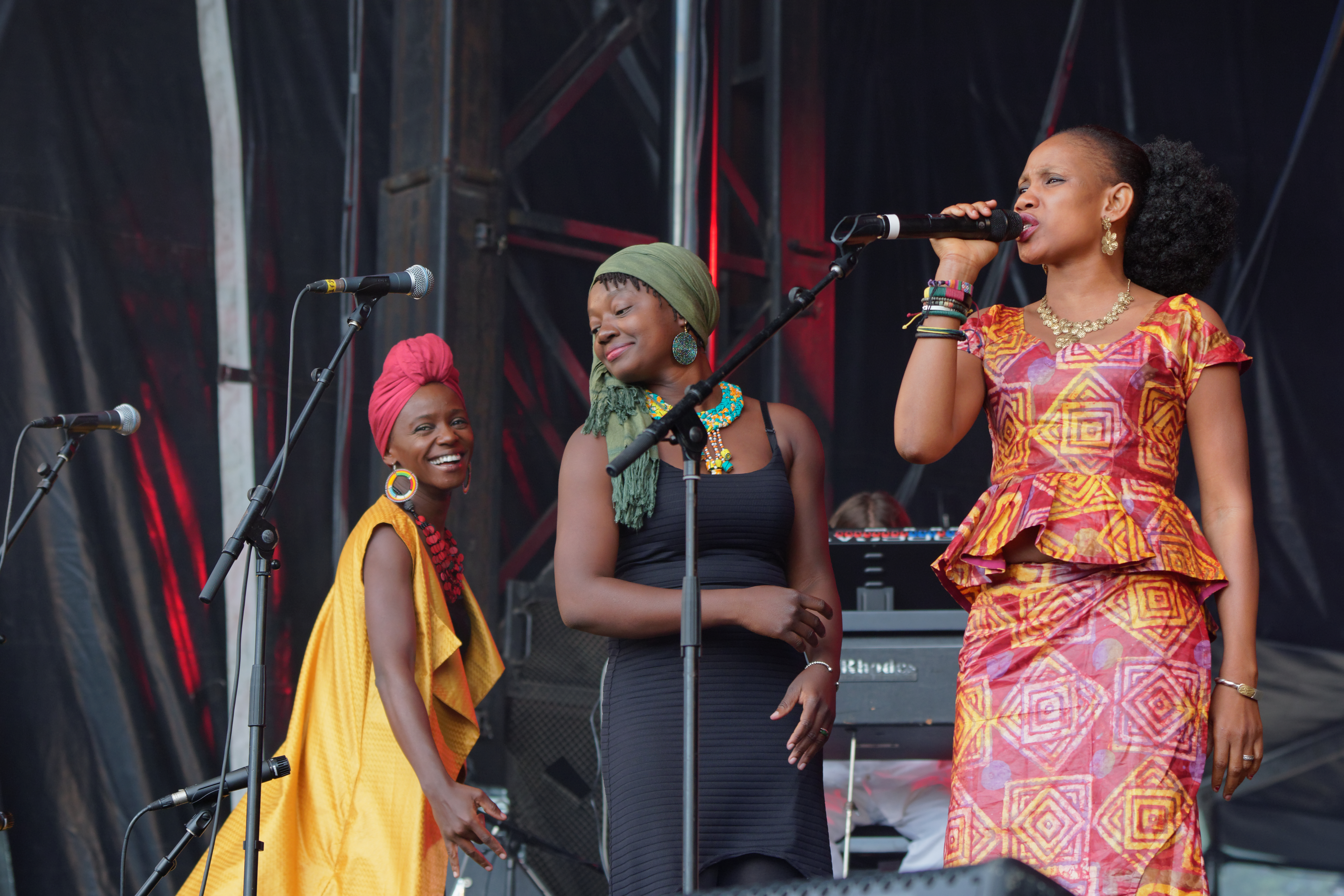
Les Amazones d'Afrique - Festival du Bout du Monde 2016 - Badjogo on the left.

Badjogo was one of the original line-up of the Les Amazones d'Afrique. The group used music to confront issues affecting women, as Badjogo said: 'We are sick of seeing women suffer because of violence ... In the family, in the war zones. We want it to stop." The group's first album, République Amazone, was a protest record explicitly addressing against the inequality and sexual violence faced by women.

=== Discography ===
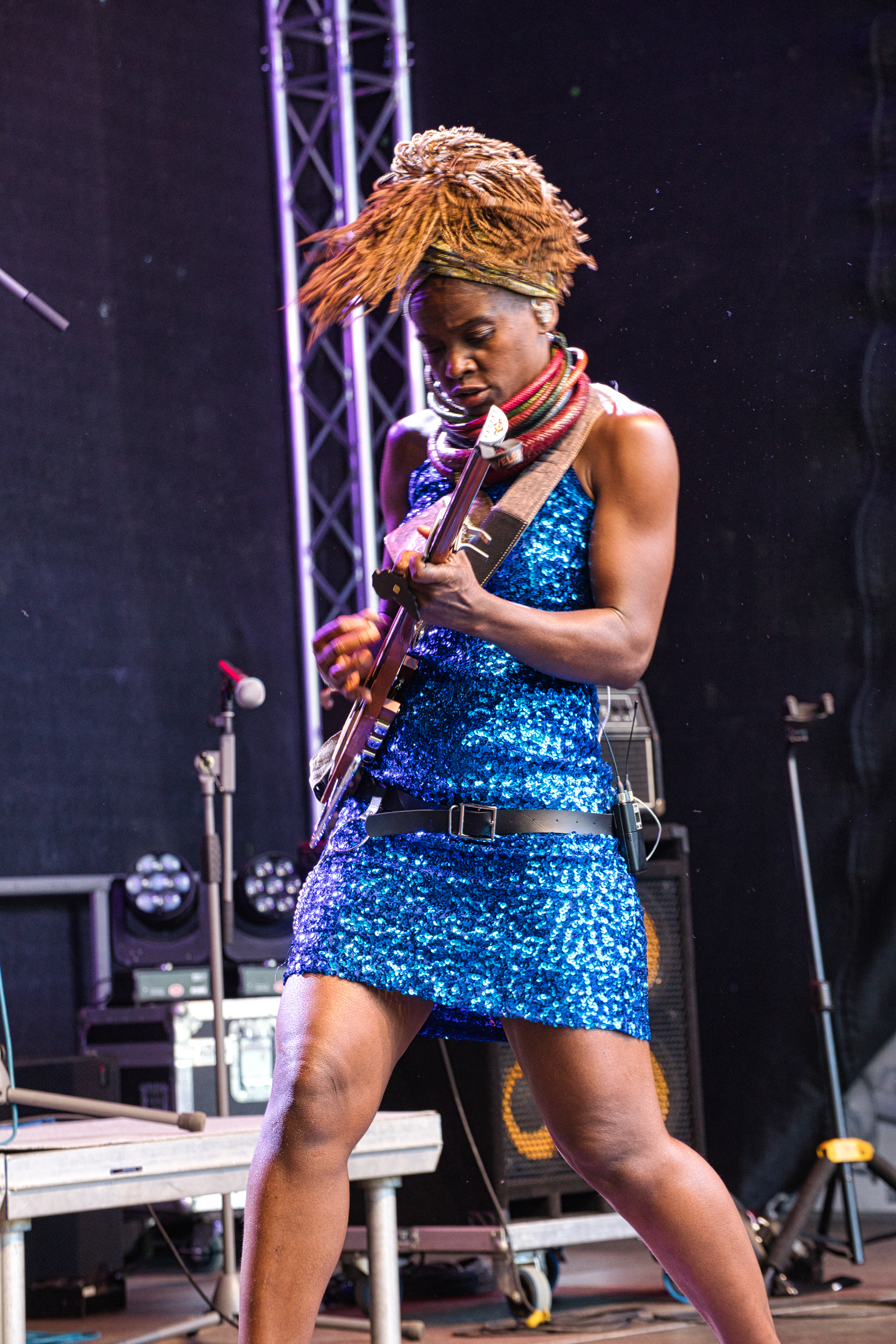
Pamela Badjogo at Rudolstadt-Festival 2023

==== Solo albums ====
- Mes Coleurs (2015)
- Kaba (2020)

==== Singles ====
- Ngoko (2019)
- Entend-il ? (2009) with Didier Awadi
- République Amazone (2017) with Les Amazones d'Afrique

=== Awards ===
Badjogo was a finalist for the RFI Discover Prize in 2016.

=== Women's Rights ===
Badjogo is a vocal advocate for women's rights. As part of her performance for the Africa Cup of Nations, she and other artists, including Josey from Côte d'Ivoire, Rokia Traoré from Mali, Charlotte Dipanda and Coumba Gawlo Seck, presented a new composition called Pour nos sœurs et pour nos mères, to raise awareness of cancers that effect women.

In April 2017, Pamela directed the "Moussoyayé Koba yé" ("It's a great thing to be a woman") program, which is a collective of artists united against gender-based violence. The initiative was supported by the Embassy of Canada and UN Women and brought together over twenty artists including Rokia Traoré, rapper Amy Yerewolo, Doussou Bagayoko, providing a concert.

In January 2018, in Cameroon, Badjogo appeared in Douala, alongside other influential figures like Sally Nyolo, to give a workshop on the empowerment of women.
