= Arbogaste Mbella Ntone =

Cameroonian singer (1941–2024)

- Born: 6 October 1941; Douala, French Cameroon
- Died: 2 October 2024 (aged 82); Paris, France
- Occupation: Singer

Arbogaste Mbella Ntone (6 October 1941 – 2 October 2024), known as Arbo, was a Cameroonian singer of gospel and Gregorian chants.

== Biography ==
Born in Douala on 6 October 1941, Mbella grew up with a passion for music and football, initially playing as a midfielder for Léopard Douala. However, he abandoned football to follow a musical career. He grew up playing a variety of instruments, namely the organ, piano, and guitar, and he became close with the pastor Adolph Lotin Same, the father of Eboa Lotin. He then performed gospel songs alongside great Cameroonian musicians such as Francis Bebey and Manu Dibango.

Mbella achieved success with song titles such as "Edube Na Loba" and "Dipita". In 1974, he moved to France to follow professional pursuits, where he directed several choirs, such as La clef des Champs de Béthune and La Rudelière de Saint-Quentin. He defined his career with gospel performances, particularly at jazz festivals and religious environments. He was the first African to win the Prix d'Interprétation of SACEM. In 2000, he was awarded the Prix Bayard d'Or. His most notable collaborations included the Golden Gate Quartet, Manu Dibango, and Rhoda Scott.

Mbella Ntone died in Paris on 2 October 2024, at the age of 82.
