= Annie-Flore Batchiellilys =

Gabonese singer, musician and composer

- Born: 10 April 1967 (age 58); Tchibanga
- Occupation: Singer Musician Composer

Annie-Flore Batchiellilys (born 10 April 1967), is a Gabonese singer, musician, and composer, combining traditional Gabonese forms of singing with jazz and blues.

== Early life ==
Annie-Flore Batchiellilys was born on 10 April 1967 in Tchibanga, in southwestern Gabon. She is a native Punu speaker.

== Career ==
Her grandmother gave her a taste for singing, but she first worked as a car mechanic. However, she was noticed in a 1988 television singing contest, Bonsoir musique, by Pierre Akendengue, who encouraged her to visit a meeting place and training course that he had created, the Carrefour des Arts in Libreville.

She went to France in 1990, initially following different formations, exploring Gypsy and Eastern registers, and jazz, at l’Ecole des Sirènes de Lyon. She then enrolled in singing and music theory classes at Studio Alice Dona in Gentilly. She then found various engagements, in choirs, and also created a duet with the Quebec singer Mario Chenart.

She released her first album, Afrique mon toit, in 1997. The album combines the musical traditions that had been transmitted through her family, with jazz and blues. She performed at the Rhino Jazz Festival in Rive-de-Gier in 1999, accompanied by the Italian percussionist Carlo Rizzo. In 2002, she received the title of best female hopeful at the Kora Awards.

In 2006, she founded the Nuits atypiques de Mighoma festival, later renamed the Mighoma International Peoples and Arts Meeting. Her stance in the 2009 presidential elections in Gabon led to her being banned in concert in Gabon, and to no longer see her tracks broadcast on radio or television. She was on stage again in Libreville in November 2015.

== Albums ==
- Afrique mon toit, 1997
- Diboty, 2002
- Je t'invite, 2003
- Broute bien, 2006
- Le chant, c'est mon chant, 2008
- Live à Olympia, 2008
- De Mighoma pour vousss, 2011
- Mon Point Zérooo, 2013
- À l’angle de mon être, 2016

== Filmography ==
- Sur la route des Anges, documentary film directed by Cameroon's Jean Roké Patoudem in 2011, on her career
