= Hasna El-Bacharia =

Algerian singer and multi-instrumentalist (1950–2024)

- حسناء البشارية
- Born: 1950; Colomb-Béchar, French Algeria
- Died: 1 May 2024 (aged 74)
- Occupations: Singer; Multi-instrumentalist

Hasna El-Bacharia (Arabic: حسناء البشارية; 28 June 1950 – 1 May 2024) was an Algerian singer and multi-instrumentalist who specialized in diwan music and playing the sintir.

== Biography ==
Born in Colomb-Béchar in 1950, El-Bacharia's playing career spanned three decades, including the album Djazair Djohara. Her style combined religious music with the profane, playing a combination of the electric guitar, the lute, the banjo, and the sintir. She was the daughter of one of the masters of diwan music who had originated from Erfoud and an Algerian mother from Béchar. Her family was distinguished for hosting wedding celebrations for women.

El-Bacharia signed with Label Bleu and, in 1976, took part in a concert hosted by the Béchar par l'Union nationale des femmes algériennes. In January 1999, she arrived in Paris at the invitation of the Cabaret Sauvage. After her first album, she participated in a number of concerts in Algeria, France, Morocco, Portugal, and Egypt. She met Italian folk musician Eugenio Bennato during performances in Italy and Egypt before returning to Algeria in 2004. In 2015, She joined the musical group Lemma Becharia comprising 12 female artists who performed Saoura music.

Hasna El-Bacharia died on 1 May 2024, at the age of 74.

== Albums ==
- Jazair Djawhara (2002)
- Smaa Smaa
- Desert Blues
- Lemma
- Couleurs du désert (2020)
