= Abdou Cherif =

Abdou Cherif عبده شريف
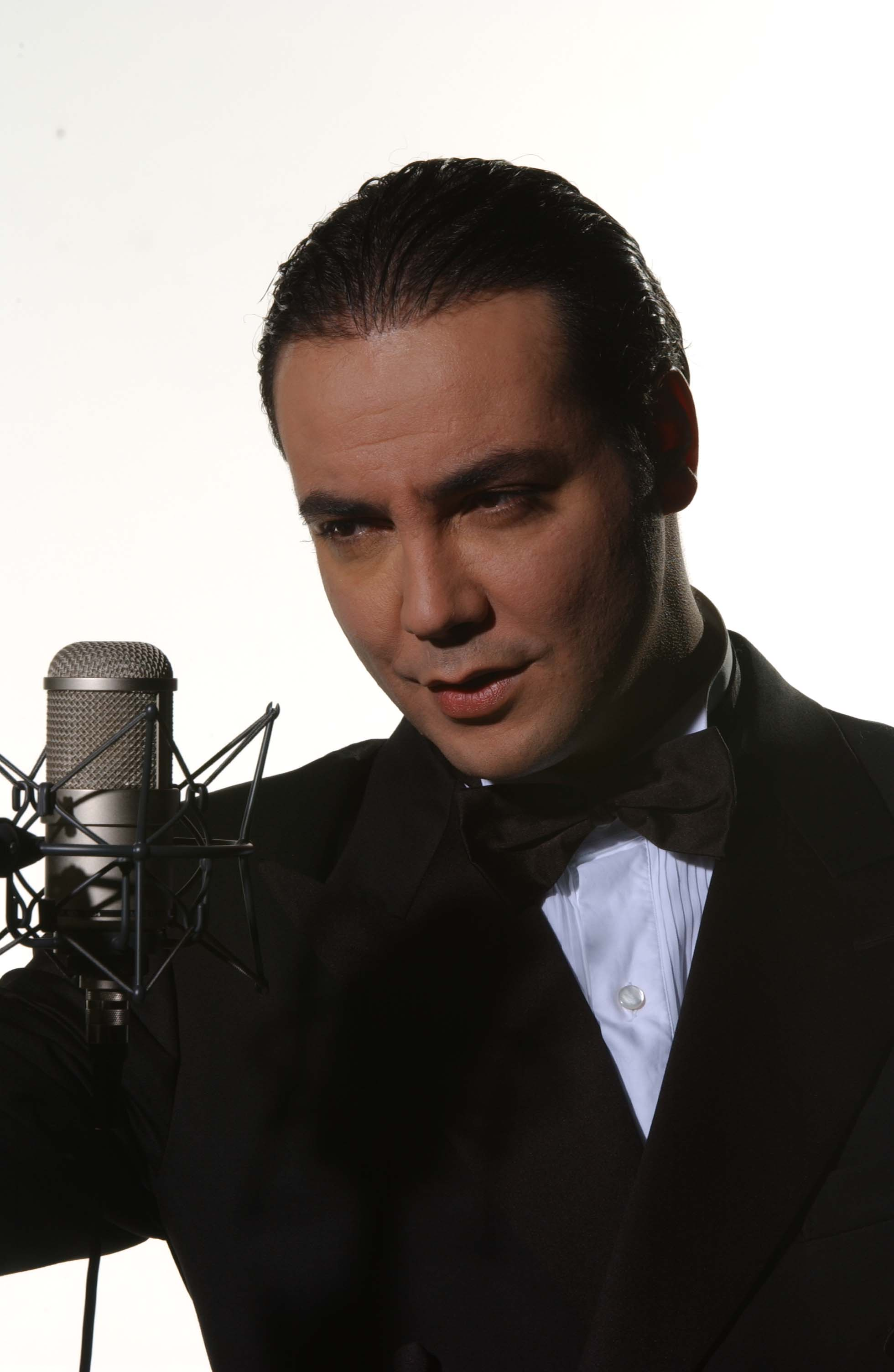
- Cherif in 2011

Background information
- Also known as: The New Nightingale
- Born: 1967; Casablanca, Morocco
- Died: 8 March 2024 (aged 57); Casablanca, Morocco
- Genres: Opera, vocal, Arabic
- Instruments: Vocals
- Years active: 1997–2024
- Website: www.abdoucherif.com

Abdou Cherif (Arabic: عبده شريف, also Abdou Chrif, Abdo Sheriff, Abdo Shrif, Abdo Sharif; 1967 – 8 March 2024) was a Moroccan singer.

== Life and career ==
Native to city of Casablanca, Cherif was the nephew of Abdelwahab Agoumi, one of the most influential artists in the modernization of Moroccan classical music in the 1950s. Following the teachings of his mentor Mahmoud Saâdi (co-founder of the musical phenomenon of the 1970s which gave birth to the well-known groups of popular music Nass El Ghiwane and Jil Jilala), Cherif saw his dream come true in 1999: to sing at the Khédival Cairo opera house in front of the public of his idol Abdelhalim Hafez. Egyptians gave him the nickname of "the New Nightingale", in reference to the "Brown Nightingale" Abdelhalim Hafez.

Cherif was also referred to by the Moroccan public as a crooner.

Abdou Cherif died from a heart attack in Casablanca, on 8 March 2024, at the age of 52.
