= Njebi language =

Bantu language spoken in Gabon and the Republic of Congo

Njebi
- Yinjebi
- Native to: Gabon, Republic of Congo
- Ethnicity: Banjabi, Bongo
- Native speakers: (140,000 cited 2000–2007)
- Language family: Niger–Congo?: Atlantic–Congo; Benue–Congo; Bantoid; Bantu (Zone B); Nzebi languages (B.50); Njebi

Language codes
- ISO 639-3: nzb
- Glottolog: njeb1242
- Guthrie code: B.52

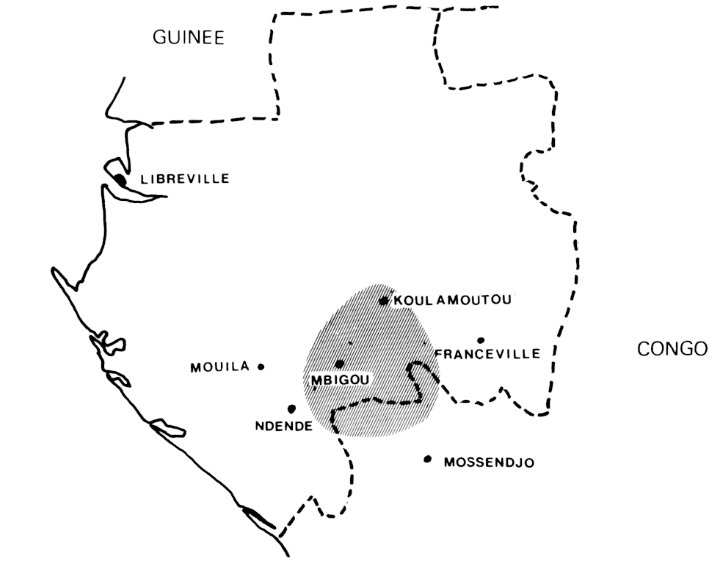
Map of Gabon, with Njebi language area in gray

Njebi (or Nzebi, Njabi, Ndzabi, Yinjebi, etc.) is a Bantu language spoken in Gabon and the Republic of Congo.

== Phonology ==
=== Consonants ===
| | | Labial | Alveolar | Palatal | Velar |
|---|---|---|---|---|---|
| Plosive | voiceless | p | t | | k |
| Plosive | voiced | b | d | | ɡ |
| Plosive | prenasal | ᵐb | ⁿd | | ᵑɡ |
| Affricate | | p͡f | t͡s | t͡ʃ | |
| Fricative | voiceless | f | s | ʃ | |
| Fricative | voiced | β | z | (ʒ) | |
| Fricative | prenasal | ᶬv | ⁿz | ⁿʒ | |
| Nasal | | m | n | ɲ | |
| Rhotic | | | r | | |
| Lateral | | | l | | |
| Approximant | | w | | j | |

- /z/ is heard as [ʒ] when before /i/.
- /ɡ/ can be pronounced as [ɣ] or [x] in free variation.
- /b/ can be heard as an implosive [ɓ] in free variation in initial position.

=== Vowels ===
| | Front | Central | Back |
|---|---|---|---|
| Close | i iː | | u uː |
| Close-mid | e eː | ə | o oː |
| Open-mid | ɛ ɛː | ə | ɔ ɔː |
| Open | | a aː | |

Vowel sounds may also be heard as tense in different positions.

== Example ==
Gabonese singer SeBa's writes and sings her songs in the Njebi language.
