= Belgacem Bouguenna =

Tunisian singer and teacher (1962/1963–2024)

- Born: Douz
- Occupations: Singer; School teacher

Belgacem Bouguenna (Arabic: بلقاسم بوقنة; 1962/1963 – 5 May 2024) was a Tunisian singer and teacher, born in Douz (Kebili). He died on 5 May 2024, at the age of 61.

== Discography ==
- El Walda ( Mother.)
- El Ghorba (Exile.)
- Fatma (His lover's name.)
- Wras 3youni (I swear on my eyes.)
