= Bamanan (album) =

Studio album by Rokia Koné and Jacknife Lee
- Released: 18 February 2022
- Genre: Bambara music, electronic dance music
- Length: 48:41
- Label: Real World
- Producer: Jacknife Lee

Rokia Koné chronology
Sassilabamba (2016)	Bamanan (2022)

Jacknife Lee chronology
The Jacknife Lee (2020)	Bamanan (2022)	Los Angeles (2023)

Singles from Bamanan
- 1. "N'yanyan" Released: 27 October 2021; 2. "Kurunba" Released: 14 January 2022

Bamanan is a collaborative studio album by Malian singer Rokia Koné and Irish producer Jacknife Lee. The album was released on 18 February 2022 by Real World Records. The album was Koné's solo debut. It was produced by Lee based on a half-finished album Koné made in Bamako. It was received positively by critics, and its two singles were nominated for two All Africa Music Awards.

== Release ==
The album's first single, "N'yanyan", was released on 27 October 2021, with a music video directed by Senegalese filmmaker Joseph Gaï Ramaka and shot inside Ramaka's Gorée home. The second single, "Kurunba", was released on 14 January 2022, with a music video directed by Zambian dancer and choreographer Kennedy Junior Muntanga which was shot in a club in London.

== Composition and recording ==
Bamanan sees producer Lee combining recordings of Koné's vocals with electronic dance music instrumentals. Koné – who is originally from Ségou, the former capital of the Bambara Empire – sings in the traditional music of her people, which Lee backs with genres such as "near-house" dance music on "Kurunba", synth-pop on "Mayougouba", and Afro-ambient on "Bi Ye Tulonba Ye", as well as turning "N'yanyan" into a piano blues ballad. Closing track "Mansa Soyari" is a reworking of a song from the Les Amazones d'Afrique album République Amazone. The album also sees contributions on guitar from Koné's frequent collaborator Sountoucoumba "Salif" Koné.

The album was originally half-completed by Koné in Bamako, who was stuck in her home country due to the ongoing COVID-19 pandemic as well as political instability. Lee, having heard Salif Koné's guitar work on Les Amazones d'Afrique's albums, was inspired to call Rokia. "Floored" by her vocals, Lee stripped away the instrumentals and composed his own.

== Reception ==
Bamanan ratings
Review scores
Source	Rating
The Arts Desk	5/5 stars
Mojo	4/5 stars
PopMatters	9/10
Uncut	7/10

The Arts Desk's Mark Kidel called the album an "outstanding meeting of the ancient and the new", with the "gutsy authenticity of Bambara music" being "resplendent in this collaboration". Mojo's David Hutcheon said songs such as "Soyi N'galanba" and "Mansa Soyari" were "positively anthemic, even arena-filling", and said "'Mayougouba' is destined to fill club dancefloors the world over." PopMatters's Adriane Pontecorvo wrote that Koné's "artistry as a singer is impeccable and only accentuated further by Lee's expertise as he builds a distinctly global stage for her work." Uncut's Stephen Dalton called Koné's vocals "melismatic, piercing, [and] richly textured", and called "Bi Ye Tulonba Ye" a "highlight, invoking U2 at their Eno/Lanois prime".

=== Awards and nominations ===
Bamanan awards and nominations
Year	Organization	Award	Work	Status	Ref.
2023	All Africa Music Awards	Songwriter of the Year	"Kurunba"	Nominated	
2023	All Africa Music Awards	Best Artiste, Duo or Group in African Traditional	"N'yanyan"	Nominated	

=== Year-end lists ===
Bamanan on year-end lists
Publication	#	Ref.
Hot Press	15	
PopMatters (Mid-year)	—	

== Track listing ==
All tracks are written by Rokia Koné and Jacknife Lee.

Bamanan track listing
No.	Title	Length
1.	"Bi Ye Tulonba Ye"	5:33
2.	"Shezita (Take a Seat)"	5:03
3.	"Kurunba"	4:26
4.	"N'yanyan"	3:36
5.	"Anw Tile (It's Our Time)"	5:32
6.	"Soyi N'galanba"	5:56
7.	"Bambougou N'tji"	4:21
8.	"Dunden"	4:48
9.	"Mayougouba"	4:26
10.	"Mansa Soyari"	5:00
Total length:		48:41

== Personnel ==
- Rokia Koné – vocals
- Jacknife Lee – producer
- Salif Koné – guitar
