= Mamani Keïta =

Malian musician (born 1965)

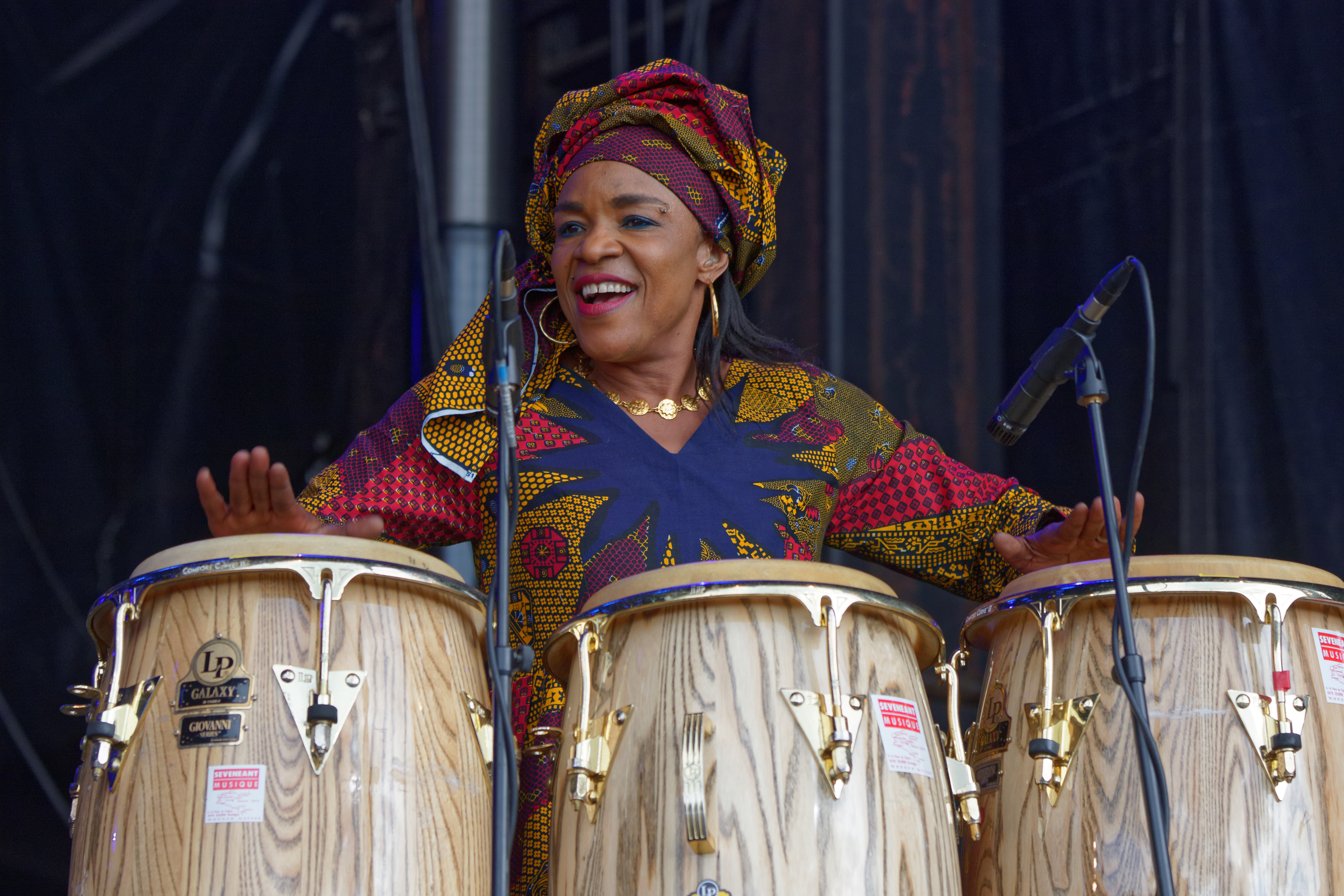

Background information
- Occupation: Singer
- Labels: No Format!, Universal Jazz
- Website: http://mamanikeita.free.fr

Assitan Keïta, popularly known as Mamani Keïta (born 20 October 1965) is a singer and musician from Mali. "Mamani" literally means "grandmother".

She was born in Bamako, grew up speaking Bambara, and was a backup singer for Salif Keita. She is best known in English speaking countries for her album with Marc Minelli, Electro Bamako. She is credited on four tracks of the soundtrack album of the French animated film Kirikou et les bêtes sauvages (2005). Mamani Keita released her second album entitled Yéléma in 2006 and Gagner l'Argent Français in 2011. Both albums were produced and composed by French multi-instrumentalist Nicolas Repac.

== Discography ==
- Electro Bamako (2002, Universal Jazz)
- Yelema (2006, No Format!)
- Gagner l'Argent Français (2011, No Format!)
- Kanou (2014, World Village)
