= Pierre Akendengué =

Gabonese musician and composer

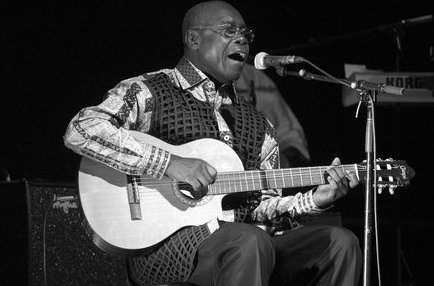
Pierre Akendengué

Pierre-Claver Akendengué (born April 25, 1943) is a Gabonese musician and composer. In 1997, he received his country's "Prix d'excellence" at the Africa Music awards in Libreville, honoring his body of work. He also serves as a cultural advisor for the government of Gabon.

== Biography ==
Born on the island of Awuta, which is located just off the coast of Port-Gentil, Akendengué went to school in Port-Gentil, then studied psychology at the University of Caen in France during the 1960s. While in France, he met the singer Mireille, who encouraged his musical interests.

In 1974, Akendengué recorded his first album, Nandipo, which consisted of songs of his own composition, sung in French and Nkomi, accompanied by guitar, women choir, bass and the percussion of Nana Vasconcelos. He later set to music poems by P. E. Mondjegou, such as "Le Chant du Coupeur d'Okoumé" ("The Song of the Okoumé Cutter"). Returning to Gabon, he studied solfeggio and plainchant at a Catholic college, and presented spectacles showcasing traditional Gabonese forms in a concert setting.

In 1986, he received a doctorate from the University of Paris for his study of religion and education among the Nkomi.

== Discography ==
- 1974 Nandipo
- 1976 Africa Obota
- 1978 Eseringuila
- 1979 Owende
- 1980 Mengo
- 1982 Awana W'Afrika
- 1983 Mando
- 1984 Réveil de l'Afrique
- 1986 Piroguier
- 1986 Sarraouinia
- 1988 Espoir à Soweto
- 1990 Silence
- 1993 Lambarena
- 1995 Maladadite
- 1996 Carrefour Rio
- 2000 Obakadences
- 2004 Ekunda-Sah
- 2005 Gorée
- 2009 La Verité d'Afrique
- 2013 Destinée
- 2018 La couleur de l´Afrique
