= Outline of Gabon =

Country in Central Africa

The Flag of Gabon

The Coat of arms of Gabon

The location of Gabon

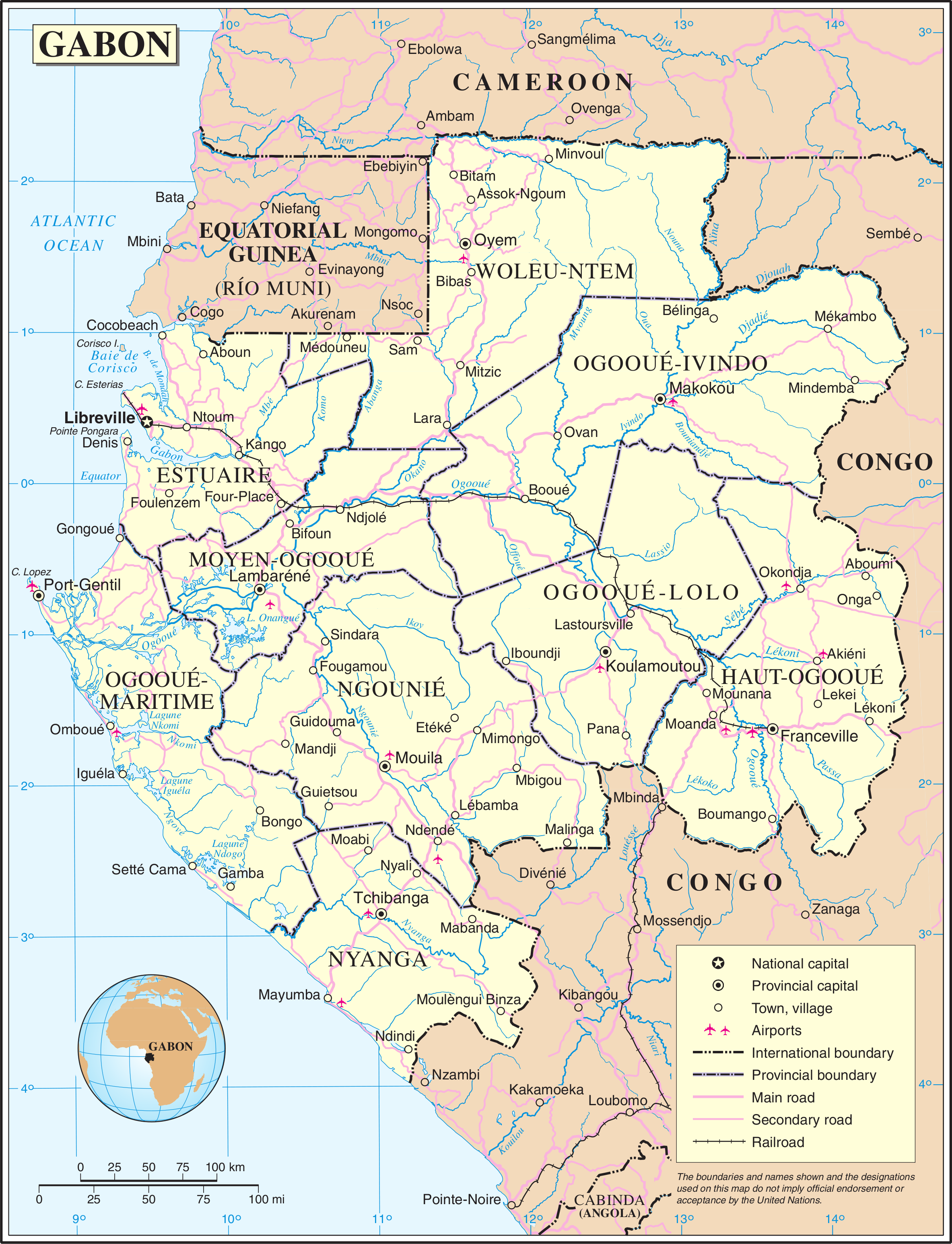
An enlargeable map of the Gabonese Republic

The following outline is provided as an overview and topical guide to Gabon (the Gabonese Republic):

Gabon – country in west central Africa sharing borders with the Gulf of Guinea to the west, Equatorial Guinea to the northwest, and Cameroon to the north, with the Republic of the Congo curving around the east and south. The small population density together with abundant natural resources and foreign private investment have helped make Gabon one of the most prosperous countries in the region, with the highest HDI in Sub-Saharan Africa.

== General reference ==
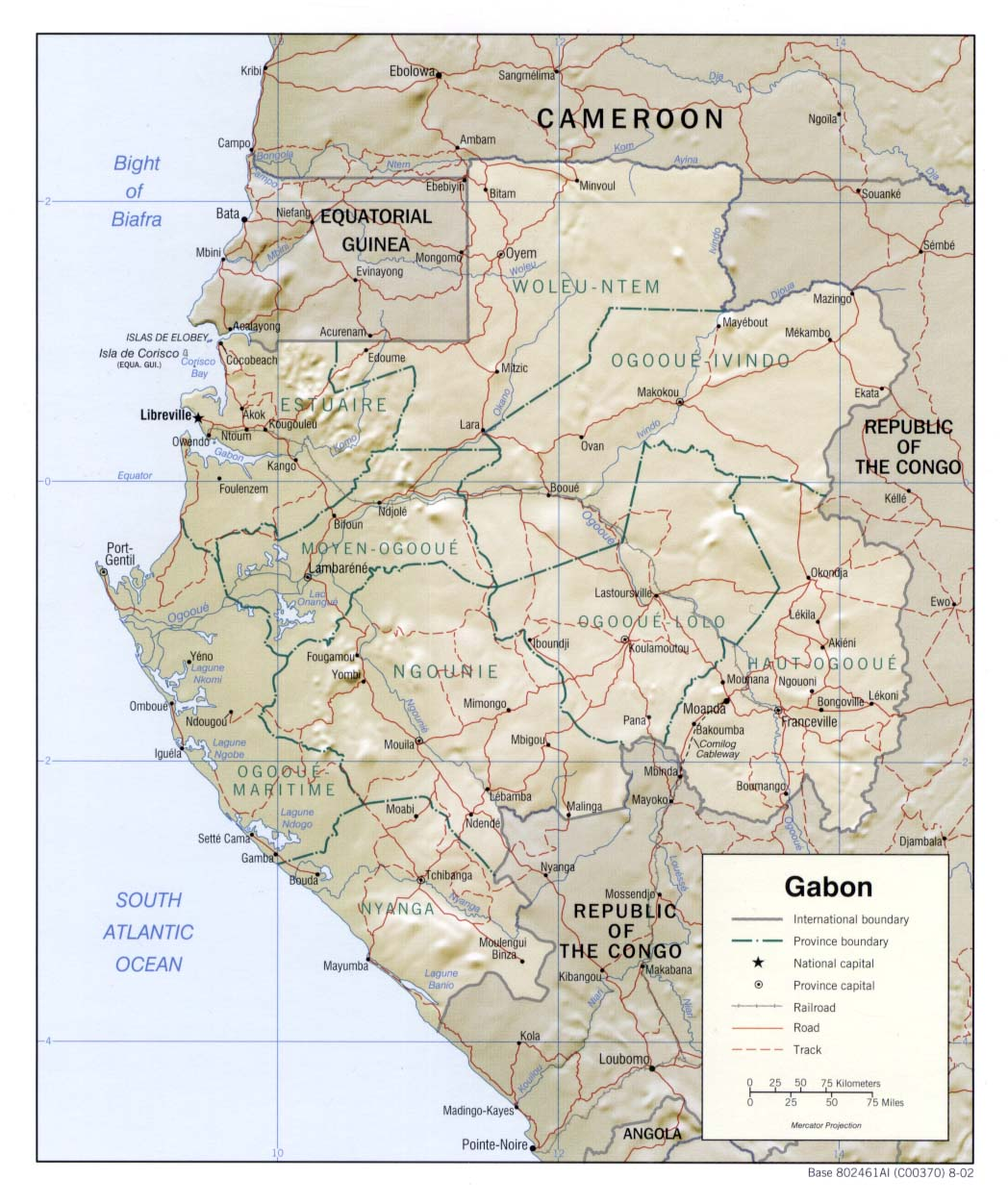
An enlargeable relief map of Gabon

- Pronunciation: /ɡəˈbɒn/
- Common English country name: Gabon
- Official English country name: The Gabonese Republic
- Common endonym(s):
- Official endonym(s):
- Adjectival(s): Gabonese
- ISO country codes: GA, GAB, 266
- ISO region codes: See ISO 3166-2:GA
- Internet country code top-level domain: .ga

== Geography of Gabon ==
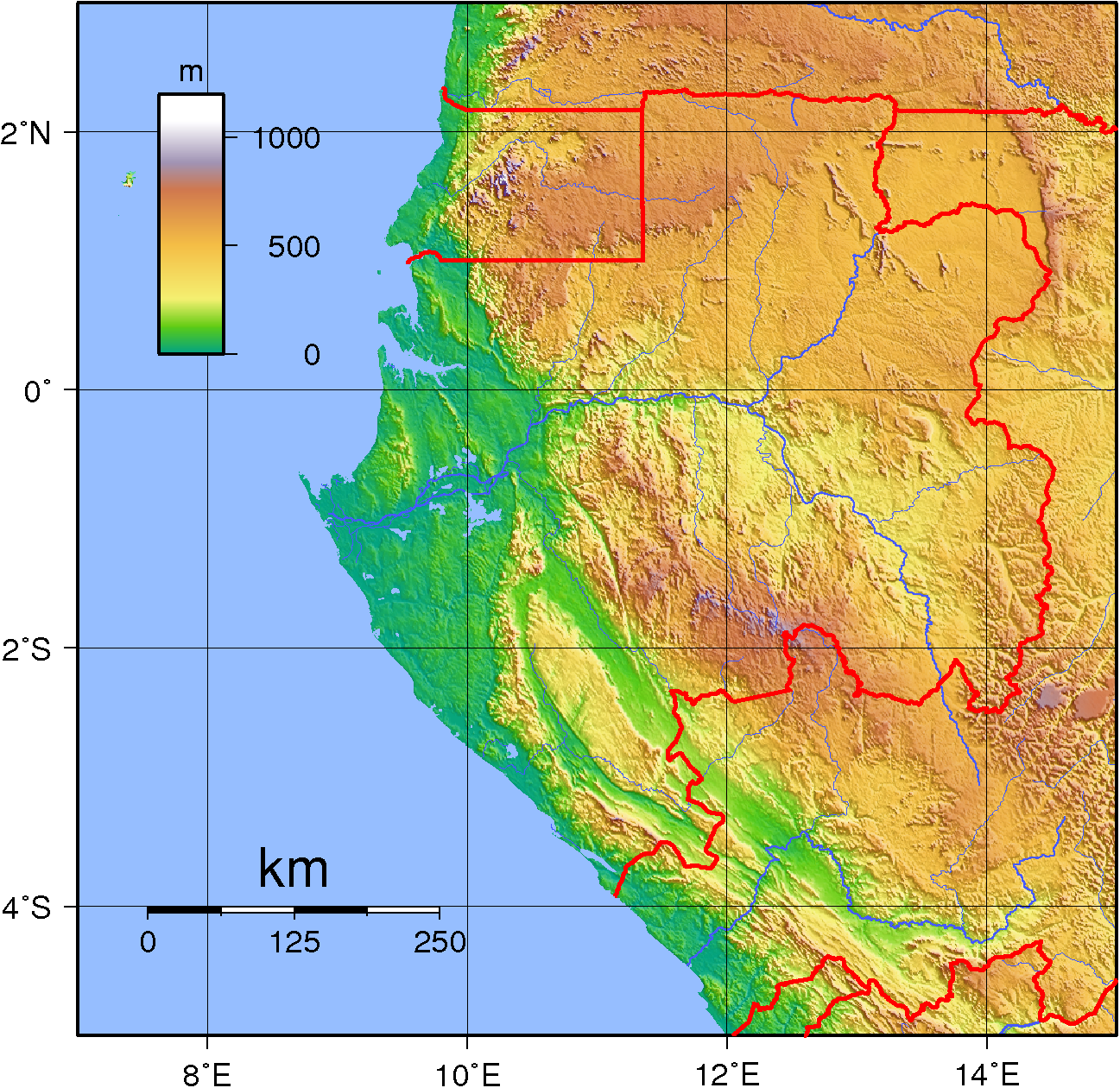
An enlargeable topographic map of Gabon

Geography of Gabon

- Gabon is: a country
- Location:
  - Eastern Hemisphere, on the Equator
  - Africa
    - Middle Africa
  - Time zone: West Africa Time (UTC+01)
  - Extreme points of Gabon
    - High: Mont Bengoué 1,070 m (3,510 ft)
    - Low: Atlantic Ocean 0 m
  - Land boundaries: 2,551 km

Republic of the Congo 1,903 km
Equatorial Guinea 350 km
Cameroon 298 km

- Coastline: South Atlantic Ocean 885 km

- Population of Gabon: 2,172,579 - 142nd most populous country
- Area of Gabon:
  - Total: 267,667 km^{2}
  - Land: 257,667 km^{2}
  - Water: 10,000 km^{2}
- Atlas of Gabon

=== Environment of Gabon ===
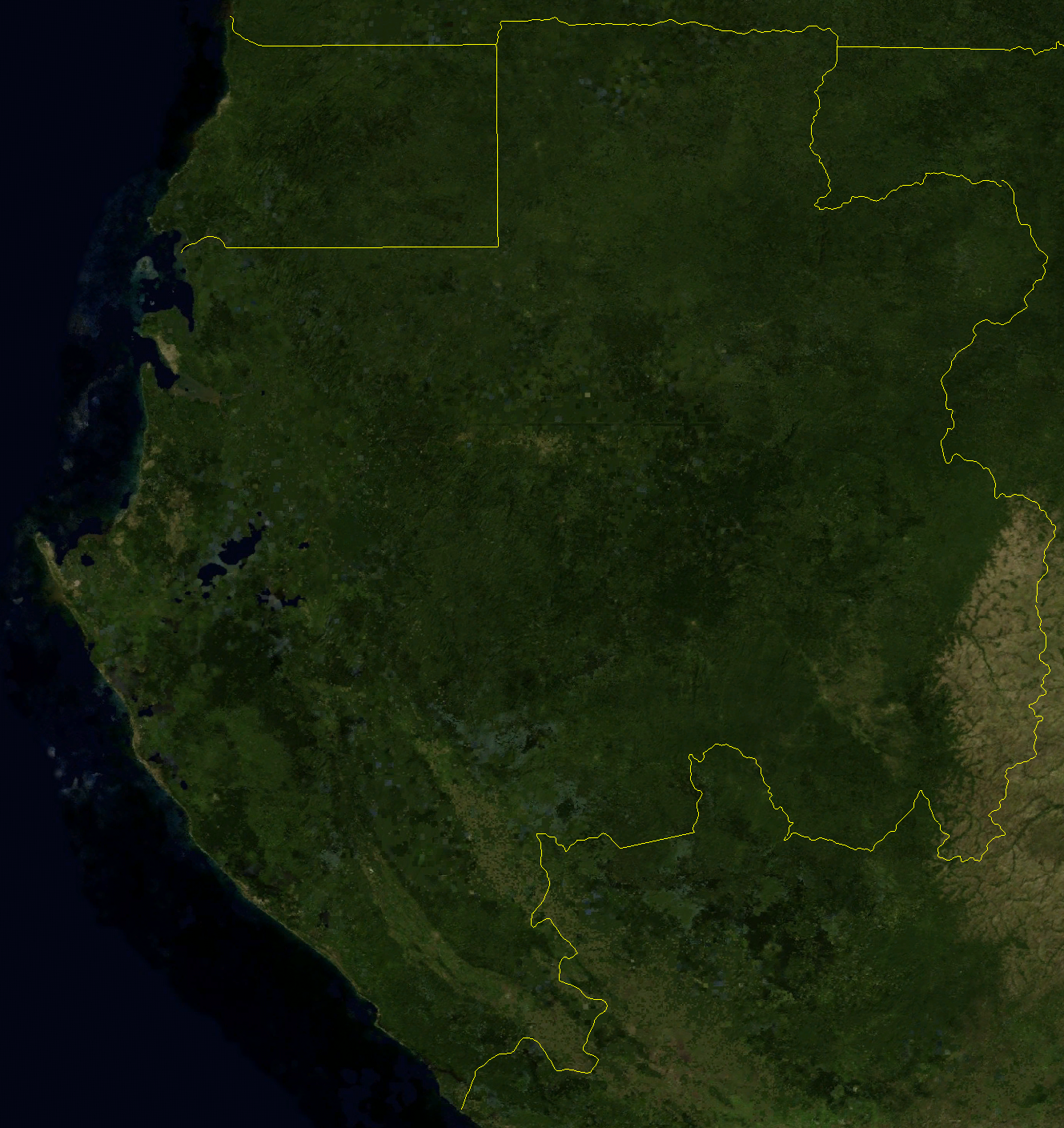
An enlargeable satellite image of Gabon

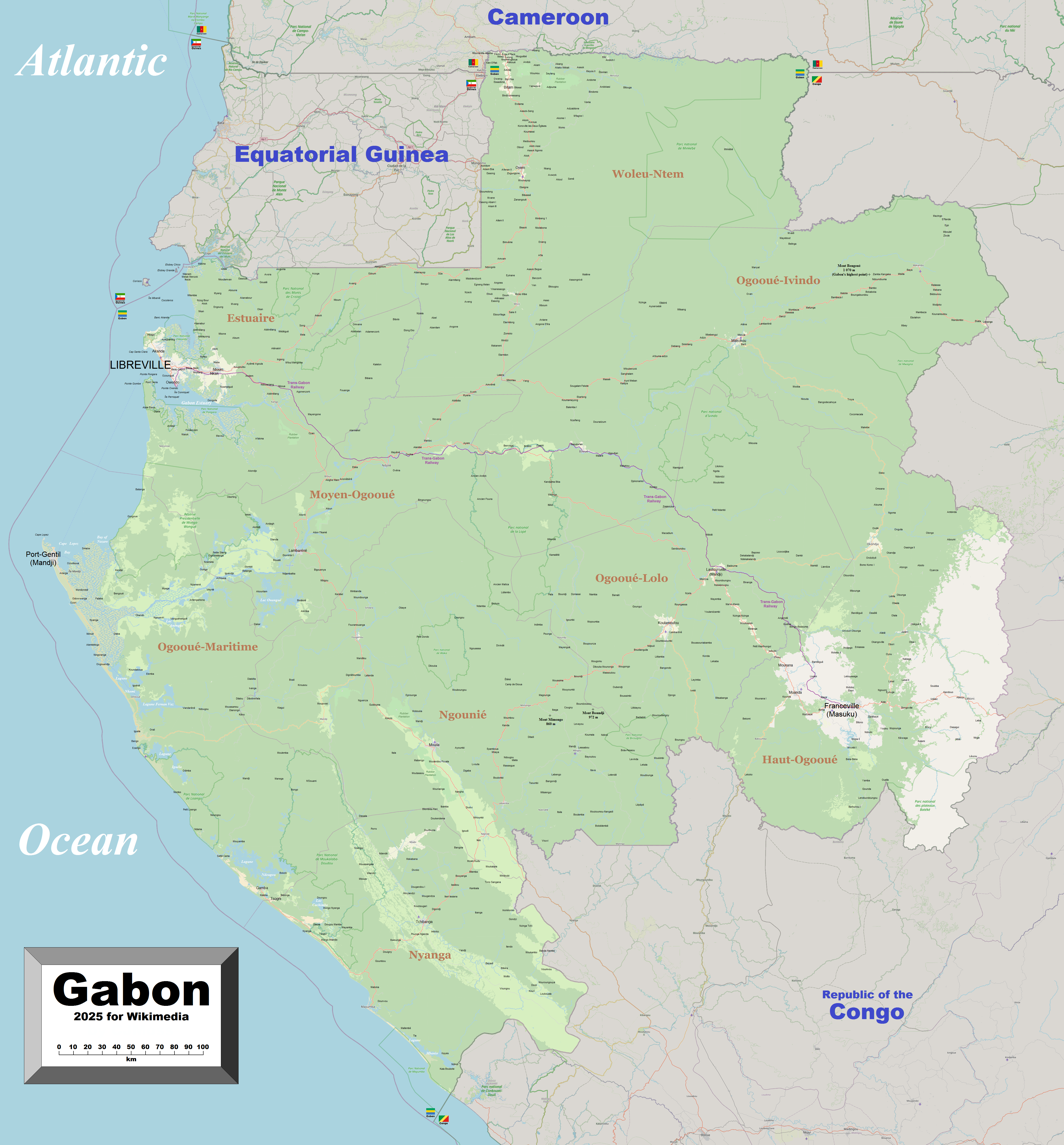
An enlargeable map of Gabon's cities, towns and villages

- Climate of Gabon
- List of ecoregions in Gabon
- List of national parks of Gabon
- Wildlife of Gabon
  - List of birds of Gabon
  - List of mammals of Gabon

==== Natural geographic features of Gabon ====
- Glaciers in Gabon: none
- List of rivers of Gabon
- World Heritage Sites in Gabon

=== Regions of Gabon ===
Regions of Gabon

==== Ecoregions of Gabon ====
List of ecoregions in Gabon

==== Administrative divisions of Gabon ====
Administrative divisions of Gabon

===== Provinces of Gabon =====
Provinces of Gabon

===== Departments of Gabon =====
Departments of Gabon

===== Municipalities of Gabon =====
- Capital of Gabon: Libreville
- Cities of Gabon

=== Demography of Gabon ===
Demographics of Gabon

== Government and politics of Gabon ==
Politics of Gabon

- Form of government: presidential republic
- Capital of Gabon: Libreville
- Elections in Gabon
- List of political parties in Gabon

=== Branches of the government of Gabon ===
==== Executive branch of the government of Gabon ====
- Head of state: President of Gabon, Brice Oligui Nguema
- Head of government: President of Gabon, Brice Oligui Nguema

==== Legislative branch of the government of Gabon ====
- Parliament of Gabon (bicameral)
  - Upper house: Senate of Gabon
  - Lower house: National Assembly of Gabon

==== Judicial branch of the government of Gabon ====
Court system of Gabon

=== Foreign relations of Gabon ===
Foreign relations of Gabon

- Diplomatic missions in Gabon
- Diplomatic missions of Gabon
- United States-Gabon relations

==== International organization membership ====
The Gabonese Republic is a member of:

- African, Caribbean, and Pacific Group of States (ACP)
- African Development Bank Group (AfDB)
- African Union (AU)
- African Union/United Nations Hybrid operation in Darfur (UNAMID)
- Commonwealth of Nations
- Conference des Ministres des Finances des Pays de la Zone Franc (FZ)
- Development Bank of Central African States (BDEAC)
- Economic and Monetary Community of Central Africa (CEMAC)
- Food and Agriculture Organization (FAO)
- Group of 24 (G24)
- Group of 77 (G77)
- International Atomic Energy Agency (IAEA)
- International Bank for Reconstruction and Development (IBRD)
- International Civil Aviation Organization (ICAO)
- International Criminal Court (ICCt)
- International Criminal Police Organization (Interpol)
- International Development Association (IDA)
- International Federation of Red Cross and Red Crescent Societies (IFRCS)
- International Finance Corporation (IFC)
- International Fund for Agricultural Development (IFAD)
- International Labour Organization (ILO)
- International Maritime Organization (IMO)
- International Mobile Satellite Organization (IMSO)
- International Monetary Fund (IMF)
- International Olympic Committee (IOC)
- International Organization for Migration (IOM)
- International Organization for Standardization (ISO) (correspondent)
- International Red Cross and Red Crescent Movement (ICRM)
- International Telecommunication Union (ITU)
- International Telecommunications Satellite Organization (ITSO)
- International Trade Union Confederation (ITUC)
- Inter-Parliamentary Union (IPU)
- Islamic Development Bank (IDB)
- Multilateral Investment Guarantee Agency (MIGA)
- Nonaligned Movement (NAM)
- Organisation internationale de la Francophonie (OIF)
- Organisation of Islamic Cooperation (OIC)
- Organisation for the Prohibition of Chemical Weapons (OPCW)
- Organization of the Petroleum Exporting Countries (OPEC)
- United Nations (UN)
- United Nations Conference on Trade and Development (UNCTAD)
- United Nations Educational, Scientific, and Cultural Organization (UNESCO)
- United Nations Industrial Development Organization (UNIDO)
- United Nations Mission in the Central African Republic and Chad (MINURCAT)
- United Nations Mission in the Sudan (UNMIS)
- Universal Postal Union (UPU)
- World Confederation of Labour (WCL)
- World Customs Organization (WCO)
- World Federation of Trade Unions (WFTU)
- World Health Organization (WHO)
- World Intellectual Property Organization (WIPO)
- World Meteorological Organization (WMO)
- World Tourism Organization (UNWTO)
- World Trade Organization (WTO)

=== Law and order in Gabon ===
- LGBT rights in Gabon
- Law enforcement in Gabon

=== Military of Gabon ===
Military of Gabon

- Forces
  - Army of Gabon
  - Air Force of Gabon

=== Local government in Gabon ===
Local government in Gabon

== History of Gabon ==
History of Gabon

- Current events of Gabon

== Culture of Gabon ==
Culture of Gabon

- Cuisine of Gabon
- Languages of Gabon
- National symbols of Gabon
  - Coat of arms of Gabon
  - Flag of Gabon
  - National anthem of Gabon
- Public holidays in Gabon
- Religion in Gabon
  - Hinduism in Gabon
  - Islam in Gabon
- World Heritage Sites in Gabon

=== Art in Gabon ===
- Music of Gabon

=== Sports in Gabon ===
Sports in Gabon

- Football in Gabon
- Gabon at the Olympics

== Economy and infrastructure of Gabon ==
Economy of Gabon

- Economic rank, by nominal GDP (2025): 126th (one hundred and twenty-sixth)
- Agriculture in Gabon
- Communications in Gabon
  - Internet in Gabon
- Companies of Gabon
- Currency of Gabon: Franc
  - ISO 4217: XAF
- Energy in Gabon
- Health care in Gabon
- Mining in Gabon
- Tourism in Gabon
- Transport in Gabon
  - List of airports in Gabon
  - Rail transport in Gabon
  - Roads in Gabon

== Education in Gabon ==
Education in Gabon

== Health in Gabon ==
Health in Gabon

== See also ==
- List of international rankings
- List of Gabonese people
- Member state of the United Nations
- Outline of Africa
- Outline of geography
