= Telecommunications in Gabon =

Telecommunications in Gabon include radio, television, fixed and mobile telephones, and the Internet.

== Radio and television ==
Radio stations:

- state owns and operates 2 radio stations; a private radio station; transmissions of at least 2 international broadcasters are accessible (2007);
- 6 AM, 7 FM, and 4 shortwave stations (2001).

Radios: 208,000 (1997).

Television stations:

- state owns and operates 2 TV stations; a private TV station; satellite service subscriptions are available (2007);
- 4 stations plus 4 low-power repeaters (2001).

Television sets: 63,000 (1997).

There are two main broadcasters in Gabon. The state broadcaster, Radiodiffusion Télévision Gabonaise (RTG), operates two main networks - a national network in French and a provincial network in French and vernacular languages. There is also a special programme on RTG's FM frequencies.

Perhaps the most important station in Gabon and one that many shortwave radio listeners are familiar with is the privately owned Afrique Numero Un (Africa Number One) which operates on FM in the capital, Libreville, area and also broadcasts via shortwave. Afrique Numero Un also has relay stations in mostly French-speaking African countries.

Radio France Internationale (RFI) has relay stations throughout Gabon. Other privately owned stations also operate in Gabon, though concentrated mostly in the Libreville area.

Like many former French colonies, Gabon uses the SECAM-K television standard. Two television channels, 4 and 8, are found in the Libreville area. All other channels and repeaters relay channel 4.

The constitution and law provide for freedom of speech and press, and the government generally respects these rights, although the government has suspended newspapers and television stations for disrupting public order or libel.

== Telephones ==
Calling code: +241

International call prefix: 00

Main lines:

- 17,000 lines in use, 194th in the world (2012);
- 26,500 lines in use, 182nd in the world (2007);
- 39,100 lines in use, 169th in the world (2005).

Mobile cellular:

- 2.9 million lines, 133rd in the world (2012);
- 1.2 million lines, 129th in the world (2007);
- 649,800 lines, 125th in the world (2005).

Telephone system: adequate system of cable, microwave radio relay, tropospheric scatter, radiotelephone communication stations, and a domestic satellite system with 12 earth stations; a growing mobile-cellular network with multiple providers is making telephone service more widely available with mobile-cellular teledensity exceeding 100 per 100 persons.

Satellite earth stations: 3 Intelsat (Atlantic Ocean) (2011).

Communications cables: South Atlantic 3/West Africa Submarine Cable (SAT-3/WASC) fiber-optic cable system provides connectivity to Europe and Asia; Africa Coast to Europe (ACE), cable system connecting countries along the west coast of Africa to each other and to Portugal and France.

== Internet ==
Top-level domain: .ga

Internet users:

- 138,584 users, 166th in the world; 8.6% of the population, 175th in the world (2012).
- 98,800 users, 160th in the world (2009);
- 67,000 users, 144th in the world (2005).

Fixed broadband:

In 2013, Government signs with the World Bank to develop the Central African Backbone. Over 1200 km of fiber optic is deployed around the country. In 2017, over 20 cities and villages are serviced by this new network operated by Axione (Bouygues French company). 70% of the gabonese population can access mobile broadband services.

5,147 subscriptions, 160th in the world; 0.3% of the population, 154th in the world (2012).

Wireless broadband:

Introducing 3G/4G licences in 2014

Unknown (2012).

Internet hosts:

- 127 hosts, 205th in the world (2012);
- 88 hosts, 192nd in the world (2008).

IPv4: 169,472 addresses allocated, less than 0.05% of the world total, 105.4 addresses per 1000 people (2012).

Internet Service Providers (ISPs): Solsi Gabon, TLDC offer a WiMax network all over Libreville and Port-Gentil.

=== ICTS IN SUSTAINABLE DEVELOPMENT AWARDS 2015 ===
Through his leadership of the Gabonese Republic, President Ali Bongo Ondimba has led his nation to receive much international recognition for its commitment to progress in the field of ICT in the Central and Francophone Africa region as well as on the African continent.

President Ali Bongo Ondimba has stressed the necessity of establishing infrastructure, access to ICTs, as well as ameliorating broadband connections in both the public and private sectors, especially within households. President Ondimba has affirmed his position on the importance of ICTs in the development of Gabon, stating during the 2011 Broadband Leadership Summit at ITU Telecom World in Geneva that he promised to make high-speed Internet access an irrevocable right for all Gabonese citizens.

=== Internet censorship and surveillance ===
There are no government restrictions on access to the Internet or credible reports the government monitors e-mail or Internet chat rooms without appropriate legal authority.

The constitution and law provide for freedom of speech and press, and the government generally respects these rights. Libel can be either a criminal offense or a civil matter. Editors and authors of libelous material may be jailed for two to six months and fined 500,000 to five million CFA francs ($1,008 to $10,080). Penalties for libel, disrupting public order, and other offenses also include a one- to three-month publishing suspension for a first offense and a three- to six-month suspension for repeat offenses.

Although the constitution and law prohibit arbitrary interference with privacy, family, home, or correspondence, the government does not always respect these prohibitions in practice. As part of criminal investigations, police request and easily obtain search warrants from judges, sometimes after the fact. Authorities reportedly monitor private telephone conversations, personal mail, and the movement of citizens.

== See also ==
- Gabon Telecom, largest telecommunications company in Gabon, jointly owned by the Gabon government (49%) and Maroc Telecom (51%) since 2007.
- List of terrestrial fibre optic cable projects in Africa
- Media of Gabon
- Economy of Gabon
- Gabon
