= Geography of Gabon =

Geography of Gabon République Gabonaise
- Continent: Africa
- Region: Central Africa
- Coordinates: 1°00′N 11°45′E
- Area: Ranked 77th
  - Total: 267,667 km^{2} (103,347 sq mi)
  - Land: 96.3%
  - Water: 3.7%
- Coastline: 885 km (550 mi)
- Highest point: Mont Bengoué, 1070 m (not Mont Iboundji as claimed by some authorities)
- Lowest point: Atlantic Ocean, 0 m
- Longest river: Ogooué River
- Climate: Tropical monsoon ('Am'), Tropical savanna ('Aw'); always hot, humid
- Terrain: narrow coastal plain; hilly interior; savanna in east and south
- Natural resources: Petroleum, natural gas, diamond, niobium, manganese, uranium, gold, timber, iron ore, hydropower
- Environmental issues: deforestation, poaching

Gabon map of Köppen climate classification.

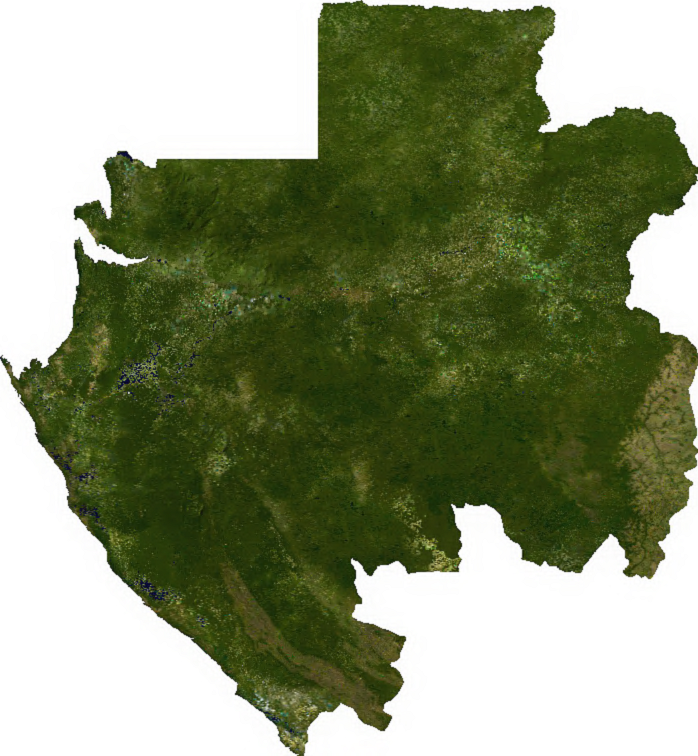
Satellite image of Gabon

Gabon is a country in Central Africa, lying along the Atlantic Ocean, just south of the Bight of Biafra.

== Area and borders ==
Area
- Total: 267,668 km²
  - country rank in the world: 76th/77th
- Land: 257,670 km²
- Water: 10,000 km²

Area comparative
- Australia comparative: approximately 1/6 larger than Victoria
- Canada comparative: approximately 2/3 the size of Newfoundland and Labrador
- United Kingdom comparative: approximately 1/10 larger than the United Kingdom
- United States comparative: slightly smaller than Colorado
- EU comparative: approximately 1/10 smaller than Italy

Gabon has a total of 3,261 km of international boundaries. It borders Equatorial Guinea (335 km) and Cameroon (349 km) to the north and the Republic of the Congo (2,567 km) to the east and south. Gabon lies on the equator.

Maritime claims
- Territorial sea: 12 nmi (22 km)
- Contiguous zone: 24 nmi (44 km)
- Exclusive economic zone: 200 nmi (370 km)

== Terrain ==
- Land Use: (2012)
  - Arable land: 1.26%
  - Permanent crops: 0.66%
  - Other: 98.08%

Share of forest area in total land area, top countries (2021). Gabon has the fourth highest percentage of forest cover in the world.

Narrow coastal plain with patches of Central African mangroves; hilly interior; savanna in east and south. A recent global remote sensing analysis suggested that there were 420 km^{2} of tidal flats in Gabon, making it the 50th ranked country in terms of tidal flat area.

- Irrigated land: 44.5 km^{2} (2003)
- Total renewable water resources: 164 km^{3} (2011)

== Environment ==
International agreements:

Party to: Biodiversity, Climate Change, Desertification, Endangered Species, Hazardous Wastes, Law of the Sea, Marine Dumping, Ozone Layer Protection, Ship Pollution, Tropical Timber 83, Tropical Timber 94, Wetlands, Whaling

== Climate ==
The equatorial location of Gabon means that it has a tropical monsoon climate (Köppen Am) and a tropical savanna climate (Köppen Aw), with the temperature being hot year-round and humid, although the Benguela Current can moderate temperatures.

Climate data for Libreville (1961–1990)
Month	Jan	Feb	Mar	Apr	May	Jun	Jul	Aug	Sep	Oct	Nov	Dec	Year
Mean daily maximum °C (°F)	29.5 (85.1)	30.0 (86.0)	30.2 (86.4)	30.1 (86.2)	29.4 (84.9)	27.6 (81.7)	26.4 (79.5)	26.8 (80.2)	27.5 (81.5)	28.0 (82.4)	28.4 (83.1)	29.0 (84.2)	28.6 (83.5)
Daily mean °C (°F)	26.8 (80.2)	27.0 (80.6)	27.1 (80.8)	26.6 (79.9)	26.7 (80.1)	25.4 (77.7)	24.3 (75.7)	24.3 (75.7)	25.4 (77.7)	25.7 (78.3)	25.9 (78.6)	26.2 (79.2)	25.9 (78.6)
Mean daily minimum °C (°F)	24.1 (75.4)	24.0 (75.2)	23.9 (75.0)	23.1 (73.6)	24.0 (75.2)	23.2 (73.8)	22.1 (71.8)	21.8 (71.2)	23.2 (73.8)	23.4 (74.1)	23.4 (74.1)	23.4 (74.1)	23.3 (73.9)
Average rainfall mm (inches)	250.3 (9.85)	243.1 (9.57)	363.2 (14.30)	339.0 (13.35)	247.3 (9.74)	54.1 (2.13)	6.6 (0.26)	13.7 (0.54)	104.0 (4.09)	427.2 (16.82)	490.0 (19.29)	303.2 (11.94)	2,841.7 (111.88)
Average rainy days	17.9	14.8	19.5	19.2	16.0	3.7	1.7	4.9	14.5	25.0	22.6	17.6	177.4
Average relative humidity (%)	86	84	84	84	84	81	81	81	84	87	87	86	84
Mean monthly sunshine hours	175.2	176.8	176.9	176.8	159.5	130.6	119.2	90.4	95.9	112.9	134.6	167.8	1,716.6
Source: NOAA

Climate data for Port-Gentil (1961–1990, extremes 1950–present)
Month	Jan	Feb	Mar	Apr	May	Jun	Jul	Aug	Sep	Oct	Nov	Dec	Year
Record high °C (°F)	32.6 (90.7)	38.0 (100.4)	34.6 (94.3)	33.7 (92.7)	33.2 (91.8)	33.2 (91.8)	30.8 (87.4)	33.1 (91.6)	33.3 (91.9)	33.0 (91.4)	34.0 (93.2)	35.0 (95.0)	38.0 (100.4)
Mean daily maximum °C (°F)	29.5 (85.1)	30.2 (86.4)	30.3 (86.5)	30.0 (86.0)	29.0 (84.2)	26.7 (80.1)	25.9 (78.6)	27.4 (81.3)	27.7 (81.9)	28.3 (82.9)	28.6 (83.5)	29.0 (84.2)	28.5 (83.3)
Daily mean °C (°F)	26.9 (80.4)	27.3 (81.1)	27.3 (81.1)	27.1 (80.8)	26.6 (79.9)	24.4 (75.9)	23.5 (74.3)	24.7 (76.5)	25.4 (77.7)	25.9 (78.6)	26.1 (79.0)	26.5 (79.7)	26.0 (78.8)
Mean daily minimum °C (°F)	24.2 (75.6)	24.4 (75.9)	24.3 (75.7)	24.2 (75.6)	24.1 (75.4)	22.0 (71.6)	21.1 (70.0)	21.9 (71.4)	23.0 (73.4)	23.5 (74.3)	23.5 (74.3)	24.0 (75.2)	23.3 (73.9)
Record low °C (°F)	17.6 (63.7)	19.4 (66.9)	19.5 (67.1)	18.0 (64.4)	19.0 (66.2)	16.4 (61.5)	16.0 (60.8)	13.2 (55.8)	18.2 (64.8)	19.5 (67.1)	15.8 (60.4)	18.2 (64.8)	13.2 (55.8)
Average precipitation mm (inches)	247.8 (9.76)	177.8 (7.00)	266.8 (10.50)	299.3 (11.78)	150.6 (5.93)	11.5 (0.45)	3.4 (0.13)	5.0 (0.20)	31.8 (1.25)	179.9 (7.08)	352.2 (13.87)	227.1 (8.94)	1,953.2 (76.90)
Average precipitation days	14.8	12.7	16.4	15.5	10.2	0.9	0.5	3.4	9.0	17.4	19.6	13.9	134.3
Average relative humidity (%)	84	84	83	84	85	84	83	82	82	84	86	84	84
Mean monthly sunshine hours	150.4	160.8	154.5	151.5	147.8	156.3	163.1	135.3	125.7	116.1	115.1	147.2	1,723.8
Source 1: NOAA
Source 2: Meteo Climat (record highs and lows)

Climate data for Lambaréné (1961–1990)
Month	Jan	Feb	Mar	Apr	May	Jun	Jul	Aug	Sep	Oct	Nov	Dec	Year
Mean daily maximum °C (°F)	31.5 (88.7)	32.2 (90.0)	32.3 (90.1)	32.5 (90.5)	31.3 (88.3)	28.9 (84.0)	27.9 (82.2)	28.4 (83.1)	30.0 (86.0)	31.0 (87.8)	30.8 (87.4)	30.9 (87.6)	30.6 (87.1)
Daily mean °C (°F)	27.2 (81.0)	27.6 (81.7)	27.6 (81.7)	27.8 (82.0)	27.2 (81.0)	25.3 (77.5)	23.9 (75.0)	24.7 (76.5)	26.1 (79.0)	26.9 (80.4)	26.9 (80.4)	27.1 (80.8)	26.5 (79.7)
Mean daily minimum °C (°F)	22.9 (73.2)	22.9 (73.2)	22.8 (73.0)	23.1 (73.6)	23.1 (73.6)	21.7 (71.1)	19.9 (67.8)	20.9 (69.6)	22.2 (72.0)	22.8 (73.0)	23.0 (73.4)	23.2 (73.8)	22.4 (72.3)
Average precipitation mm (inches)	175.3 (6.90)	145.2 (5.72)	253.8 (9.99)	212.8 (8.38)	162.2 (6.39)	20.9 (0.82)	3.2 (0.13)	6.9 (0.27)	71.0 (2.80)	347.7 (13.69)	393.9 (15.51)	172.0 (6.77)	1,968.9 (77.52)
Average precipitation days	12.1	10.7	15.0	14.1	13.8	2.9	2.1	5.1	9.6	21.9	20.8	12.5	140.6
Average relative humidity (%)	83	81	81	81	83	84	82	81	80	81	83	84	82
Mean monthly sunshine hours	142.9	145.2	145.1	143.1	123.9	74.2	70.6	53.4	55.9	70.9	117.1	129.4	1,271.7
Source: NOAA

Climate data for Makokou (1961–1990, extremes 1949–present)
Month	Jan	Feb	Mar	Apr	May	Jun	Jul	Aug	Sep	Oct	Nov	Dec	Year
Record high °C (°F)	34.0 (93.2)	41.5 (106.7)	37.0 (98.6)	39.5 (103.1)	41.1 (106.0)	37.3 (99.1)	32.5 (90.5)	33.0 (91.4)	35.4 (95.7)	37.2 (99.0)	36.0 (96.8)	33.5 (92.3)	41.5 (106.7)
Mean daily maximum °C (°F)	29.2 (84.6)	30.1 (86.2)	30.5 (86.9)	30.5 (86.9)	29.8 (85.6)	27.7 (81.9)	25.8 (78.4)	26.6 (79.9)	28.7 (83.7)	29.2 (84.6)	28.7 (83.7)	27.6 (81.7)	28.7 (83.7)
Daily mean °C (°F)	24.4 (75.9)	24.9 (76.8)	25.2 (77.4)	25.3 (77.5)	24.8 (76.6)	23.4 (74.1)	22.2 (72.0)	22.5 (72.5)	24.0 (75.2)	24.4 (75.9)	24.1 (75.4)	23.5 (74.3)	24.1 (75.4)
Mean daily minimum °C (°F)	19.5 (67.1)	19.7 (67.5)	19.8 (67.6)	20.0 (68.0)	19.8 (67.6)	19.0 (66.2)	18.6 (65.5)	18.4 (65.1)	19.2 (66.6)	19.5 (67.1)	19.5 (67.1)	19.3 (66.7)	19.4 (66.9)
Record low °C (°F)	15.9 (60.6)	15.0 (59.0)	16.3 (61.3)	16.6 (61.9)	16.8 (62.2)	14.2 (57.6)	11.5 (52.7)	13.0 (55.4)	13.5 (56.3)	15.0 (59.0)	17.0 (62.6)	15.2 (59.4)	11.5 (52.7)
Average precipitation mm (inches)	88.1 (3.47)	106.9 (4.21)	190.0 (7.48)	206.7 (8.14)	187.7 (7.39)	54.1 (2.13)	9.0 (0.35)	29.3 (1.15)	142.9 (5.63)	297.3 (11.70)	225.7 (8.89)	103.3 (4.07)	1,641 (64.61)
Average precipitation days	7.3	8.9	13.7	14.7	15.4	6.5	2.6	3.6	11.2	20.9	17.9	8.8	131.5
Average relative humidity (%)	82	79	79	79	80	83	85	83	80	80	81	83	81
Mean monthly sunshine hours	131.6	137.4	158.2	160.5	150.4	101.5	60.9	58.1	95.5	134.1	132.3	122.8	1,443.3
Source 1: NOAA
Source 2: Meteo Climat (record highs and lows)

== Forests ==
=== REDD+ reference levels and monitoring ===
Under the UNFCCC REDD+ framework, Gabon has submitted a national forest reference level (FRL). On the UNFCCC REDD+ Web Platform, Gabon's 2021 submission is listed as having an assessed reference level, and the platform also lists reported REDD+ results, a safeguards information summary, and a national REDD+ strategy.

The first assessed FRL, technically assessed in 2021, covered all five REDD+ activities at national scale - reducing emissions from deforestation, reducing emissions from forest degradation, conservation of forest carbon stocks, sustainable management of forests, and enhancement of forest carbon stocks. Using a historical reference period of 2000-2009, the assessed FRL was -96,468,186 t CO2 eq per year, revised from -97,055,549 t CO2 eq per year in the original submission. The technical assessment states that the benchmark included above-ground biomass, below-ground biomass, deadwood and litter, excluded soil organic carbon, and reported CO2 only.

The same UNFCCC country page lists Gabon's reported REDD+ results for 2010-2018 against that assessed FRL, and records results-based payments from the Central African Forest Initiative for 2016 and 2017.

=== Tree cover extent and loss ===
Global Forest Watch publishes annual estimates of tree cover loss and 2000 tree cover extent derived from time-series analysis of Landsat satellite imagery in the Global Forest Change dataset. In this framework, tree cover refers to vegetation taller than 5 m (including natural forests and tree plantations), and tree cover loss is defined as the complete removal of tree cover canopy for a given year, regardless of cause.

For Gabon, country statistics report cumulative tree cover loss of 554,641 ha (5,546.41 km^{2}) from 2001 to 2024 (about 2.2% of its 2000 tree cover area). For tree cover density greater than 30%, country statistics report a 2000 tree cover extent of 24,690,954 ha (246,909.54 km^{2}). The charts and table below display this data. In simple terms, the annual loss number is the area where tree cover disappeared in that year, and the extent number shows what remains of the 2000 tree cover baseline after subtracting cumulative loss. Forest regrowth is not included in the dataset.

Annual tree cover loss in Gabon, 2001–2024. View chart definition.
Tree cover extent in 2000 minus cumulative tree cover loss in Gabon, 2001–2024 (loss-only residual; does not account for gain). View chart definition.

Annual tree cover extent and loss
Year	Tree cover extent (km2) (Note: This residual measure does not include forest regrowth.)	Annual tree cover loss (km2)
2001	246,758.71	150.83
2002	246,620.19	138.52
2003	246,451.73	168.46
2004	246,351.90	99.83
2005	246,174.91	176.99
2006	245,981.91	193.00
2007	245,816.90	165.01
2008	245,643.23	173.67
2009	245,460.70	182.53
2010	245,353.94	106.76
2011	245,172.34	181.60
2012	244,997.58	174.76
2013	244,553.10	444.48
2014	244,065.58	487.52
2015	243,810.86	254.72
2016	243,489.35	321.51
2017	243,102.91	386.44
2018	242,835.04	267.87
2019	242,549.43	285.61
2020	242,329.21	220.22
2021	242,146.04	183.17
2022	241,851.49	294.55
2023	241,654.43	197.06
2024	241,363.13	291.30

=== Climate change ===
Gabon is highly vulnerable to climate change due to its dense coastal population, economic hubs along the shore, and dependence on rain-fed agriculture. Rising sea levels threaten to erode the coastline and contaminate freshwater sources with saltwater. The country is already experiencing more frequent and severe extreme weather events, such as floods, droughts, and storms, which damage infrastructure, displace communities, and disrupt food security and livelihoods.

To adapt, Gabon prioritises protecting its coastal areas, as well as its fishing, agriculture, and forestry industries. Gabon's vast forests act as a net carbon sink. It is recognized as a global leader in climate action and is widely considered the most carbon-positive country in the world, due to its strong conservation efforts. However, Gabon’s economy remains heavily dependent on oil and other natural resources, leaving it exposed to global market shifts and climate-related risks. In 2023, the country accounted for just over 0.04% of global greenhouse gas emissions (24.7 million tonnes). Gabon has pledged to stay carbon neutral beyond 2050 and, with adequate support, aims to maintain net carbon removals of 100 million tons CO_{2} equivalent per year beyond that date. It also seeks to expand its renewable energy sector.

== Extreme points ==
- Northernmost point - unnamed location on the border with Cameroon on the Ntem River, Woleu-Ntem province
- Easternmost point - the unnamed location on the border with the Republic of Congo immediately south-west of the Congolese village of Mbeyi-Mbola, Haut-Ogooué province
- Southernmost point - the point at which the border with the Republic of Congo enters the Atlantic Ocean, Nyanga Province
- Westernmost point - the north-west point of Cape Lopez, Ogooué Maritime province

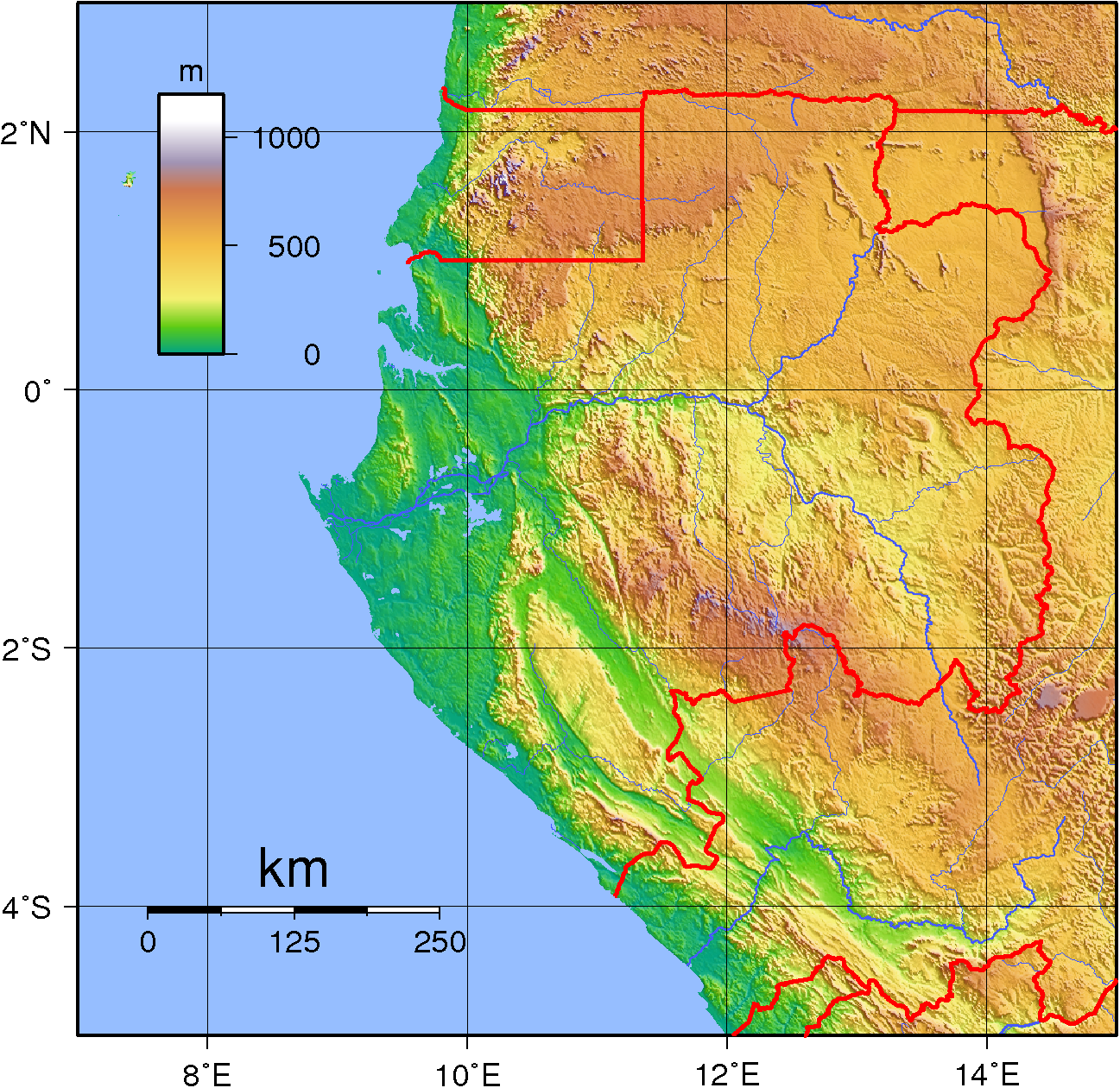
Topography of Gabon

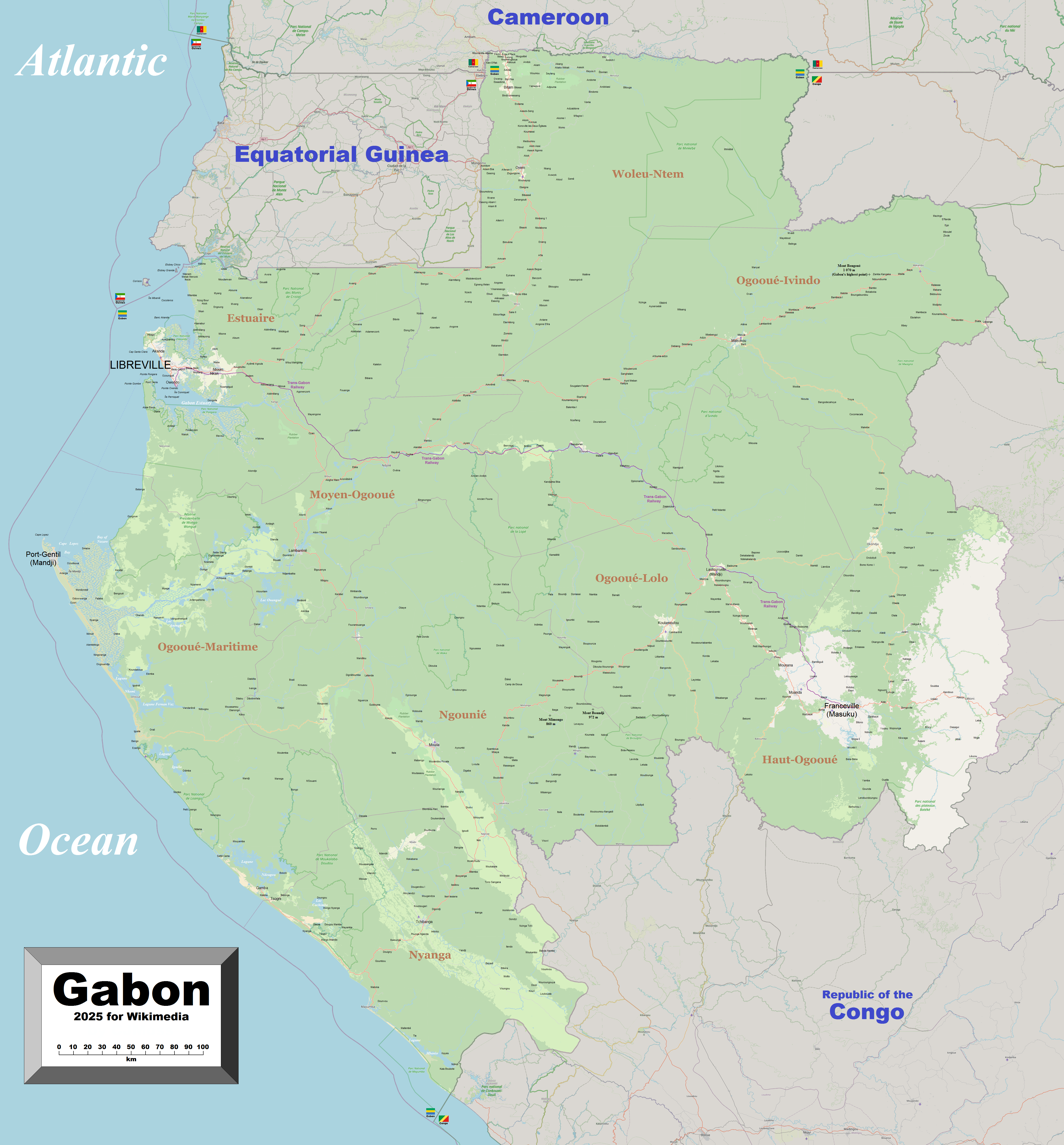
Gabon's cities, towns and villages

== See also ==
- Bam Bam Amphitheaters
