= Mass media in Gabon =

The mass media in Gabon is primarily monitored by the Gabon government. Although the main newspapers are associated with the government, there are private broadcasters, and private weekly newspapers that are mostly controlled by opposition parties.

There are two major television stations. One is a French radio network and the other is a provincial station.

== Press ==
L'Union located in Libreville, is the government controlled daily newspaper.

=== List of publications ===
Name	Language	Frequency	Ownership	Notes
Gabonews	French	Daily		Online
Gabon Actu	French	Daily		Online
Gabon d'Aujourdhui	French	Weekly	Ministry of Communications	
Gabon Eco	French	Daily		Online
Gabon Libre				Online
Gabon Matin		Daily		
Gabon Review	French	Daily		Online
Infos Plus Gabon	French	Daily		Online
Le Journal	French	Bi-monthly	Private	
La Lowe	French	Weekly	Private	
La Relance	French	Weekly	Private	
Le Temoin	French	Weekly	Private	
Le Temps	French	Weekly	Private	
L'Union		Daily	Government	

== Television ==
Radiodiffusion-Télévision Gabonaise (RTG) was established in 1959. Radio Télévision Gabonaise is one of the state run television stations. Two channels are operated under their network.

Gabon 24 is Gabon's first bilingual non-stop news television channel which launched on 24 May 2016.

Télé Africa is one of the four privately owned television stations.

== Radio ==
In 1980, a commercial radio station, Africa No. 1, was founded. In 2003 it was estimated that about 50% of the population owns radios.

Examples of radio stations include:

- Radio Frequence 3 (est. 1996)
- Radio Generation Novelle (est. 1996)
- Radio Mandarine (est. 1995)
- Radio Soleil (est. 1995)
- Radio Unite (est. 1996)
- Urban FM Gabon

== News Agencies ==
Agence Gabonaise de Presse (AGP) is an online news agency in the French language. Foreign Internet News Media includes: Africa Intelligence, Africa Time, Afrik, Afrol, All Africa, Ici Cemac, Index Mundi, IRIN, IZF, Relif Web, and Topix.

== Internet ==
By 2011, approximately 109,000 people were determined to be Internet users.

== Telecommunications ==
Gabon's oil resources and the revenue that is generated from oil rank the country high among the wealthy nations in Africa. The income in Gabon has major discrepancies. However, the gross domestic profit is one of well above the average in comparison to other African nations. In 1999, the telecommunications market become liberalized. The government established an independent regulatory authority. There mobile telephone licenses and two Internet Service Providers (ISP) licenses were also established. By 2008, Gabon Telecom became privatized when Vivendi-controlled Maroc Telecom purchased a large amount of stock. The Ministry of Information, Post and Technology's telecom operations are privitazations, acquisitions and new licenses. It includes fixed, mobile, and broadband. Gabon has one of the most penetrated mobile markets among in Africa. The major service providers include Zain, Gabon's Telecom's Libertis, and Etisalat's Moov.

== Freedom of speech ==
The Constitution of Gabon was adopted on March 26, 1991. There has been six amendments to the constitution since it was implemented in 1991, the last one on January 12, 2011. The Constitution protects the freedom of speech and the freedom of press. In the Constitution's fundamental principles and rights, the second right states: "Freedom of conscience, thought, opinion, expression, communication, and the free practise of religion shall be guaranteed to all, under the reservation of respect of public order."

== See also ==
- Telecommunications in Gabon
- Telephone numbers in Gabon

== Bibliography ==
- "Gabon: Directory: the Press". Africa South of the Sahara 2004. Regional Surveys of the World. Europa Publications. 2004. p. 450. ISBN 1857431839. (Includes broadcasting)
- "Gabon", Freedom of the Press, USA: Freedom House, 2015, OCLC 57509361
