= Télé Africa =

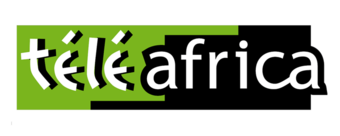
- Headquarters: Libreville, Gabon

Programming
- Language: French
- Picture format: 16:9

History
- Launched: 10 March 1988 (38 years ago)

Télé Africa is a Gabonese private television channel. A generalist channel aiming a wide audience, it airs a varied schedule with news, current affairs programs and entertainment.

It is the oldest private station in French-speaking Africa.

== History ==
Télé Africa was the first private television station to start operations in Gabon, in 1988, breaking a 25-year monopoly pertaining to Radio Télévision Gabonaise. The launch was on March 10, 1988, during the height of single-party rule, with its inauguration featuring then-president Ali Bongo. With its coverage limited to Libreville, it was initially a subscription television station, similar to Canal+ in France, with the majority of the channel's schedule consisting of newly released feature films (the majority of which were American). Ahead of the 1993 presidential elections, Télé Africa changed to a free-to-air television channel, extending its coverage area to other provinces.

In 1998, the channel, owned by TVsat, was made encrypted again. Since 2007, the channel has been facing management difficulties which led to constant strikes, interrupting programming for weeks or even months. The latest strike was announced in April 2021 after Steeve Chasa Ondo, alias "Sinsho", deposited a strike warning on March 11. Another executive, Regis Massimba, named director of programming in February, wanted to make the channel's programs, up until then "undigested", more attractive and dynamic.
