= Ravine =

Small valley, often due to stream erosion

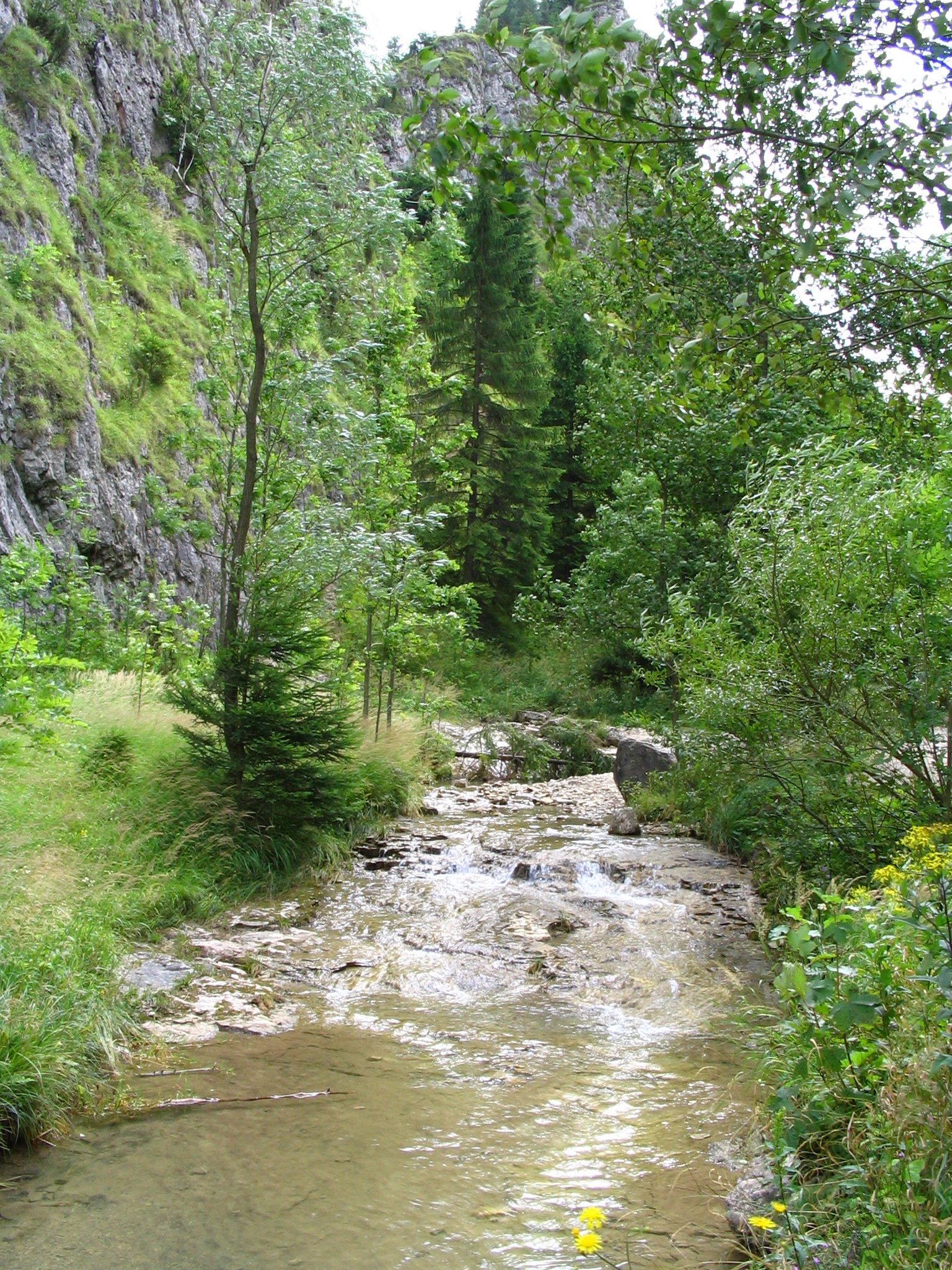
Homole Ravine, Pieniny, Poland

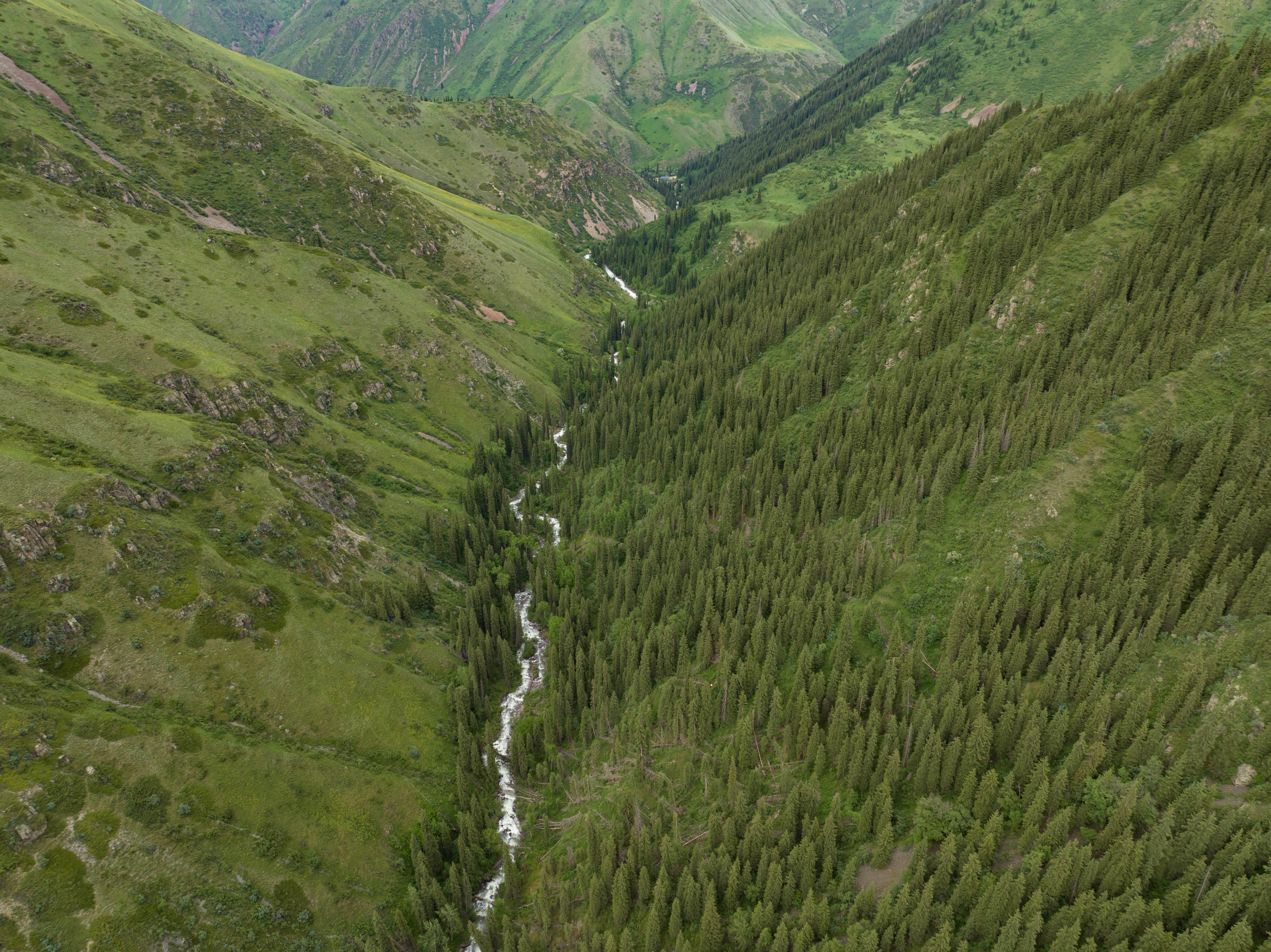
Shinturgen pine forest photographed from above. Enbekshikazakh District, Almaty Region, Kazakhstan.

A ravine is a landform that is narrower than a canyon and is often the product of streambank erosion. Ravines are typically classified as larger in scale than gullies, although smaller than valleys. A ravine may also be called a cleuch, dene or dean, dell, ghout (Nevis), gill or ghyll, glen, goyle, gorge, kloof (South Africa), or chine (Isle of Wight).

A ravine is generally a fluvial slope landform of relatively steep (cross-sectional) sides, on the order of twenty to seventy percent in gradient. Ravines may or may not have active streams flowing along the downslope channel which originally formed them. Moreover, they are often characterized by intermittent streams, since their geographic scale may not be sufficiently large to support a perennial stream.

== Definition ==
According to Merriam-Webster, a ravine is "a small, narrow, steep-sided valley that is larger than a gully and smaller than a canyon and that is usually worn by running water." Some societies and languages do not differentiate between a gully and ravine; in others, there is a distinction, particularly when concerning environmental management.

== Formation ==
Gullies are often found in hilly or mountainous regions, where water runoff is guided downhill by steep slopes and over time erodes the landscape. A ravine is the final step in gully erosion, formed when a stream has eroded so severely it forms a deep cut in the earth. A gully can be classified as a ravine after it reaches a large depth, typically in excess of 5 metres (16 ft).

== Environmental impact ==
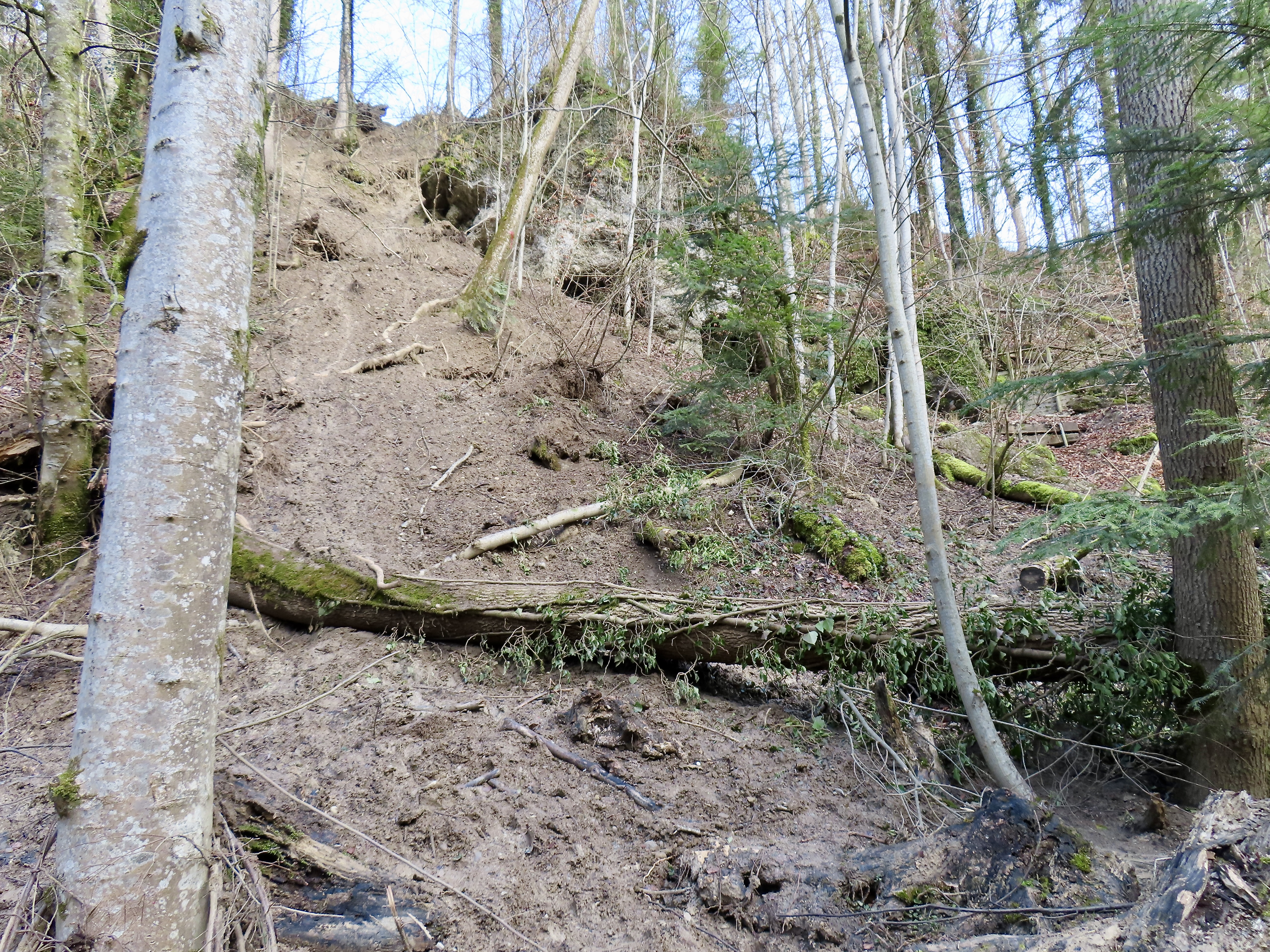
A landslide at Küsnachter Tobel, Switzerland

Ravine erosion contributes heavily to land loss globally and particularly threatens agricultural lands. Additionally, soil loss contributes to pollution, flooding, and sedimentation of waterways. The formation of ravine lands can be sped up by deforestation and overgrazing. In Indian badlands, soil erosion is estimated to exceed a rate of 40 tonnes per hectare (16 long ton/acre; 18 short ton/acre) annually.

== Examples ==
=== Hawaii ===
The shield volcanoes of Hawaii have significant impact on the distribution of ravines across the islands, specifically Mauna Loa and Mauna Kea, the former of which is one of the most active shield volcanoes on Earth. Both of these volcanoes show V-shaped ravines on their flanks, solely where they have been mantled by Pahala ash. Being the older of the two, Mauna Kea displays more pronounced dissection of these ravines. Rainfall and infiltration capacity are critical to valley initiation on the Hawaiian volcanoes. Once these valleys are initiated, their streams incise to form V-shaped ravines. Eventually, they become sufficiently deep ravine systems and expose groundwater activity. The deepest of these incisions are U-shaped, theatre-headed valleys.

=== Notable ravines ===
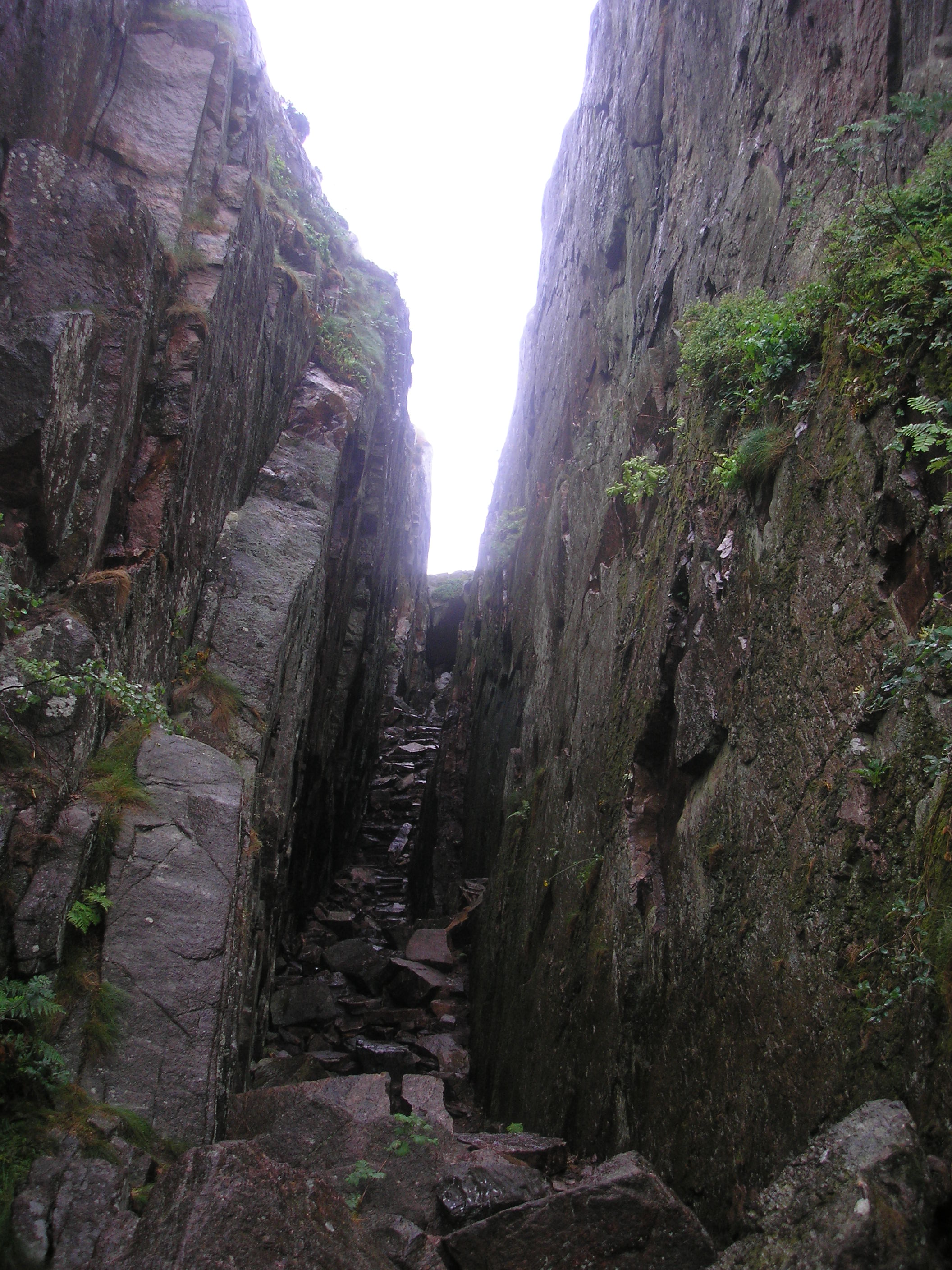
Kungsklyftan in Sweden

- Babi Yar, Ukraine
- Bam Bam Amphitheaters, Gabon
- Barranco de Badajoz, Spain
- Barranco del Infierno, Spain
- Gravina Ravine, Italy
- Moola Chotok, Pakistan
- Ravenna Park, United States
- Rauðfeldsgjá, Iceland
- Stuðlagil, Iceland
- Taishaku Valley, Japan
- Toronto ravine system, Canada
