= Mont Iboundji =

Mountain in Gabon

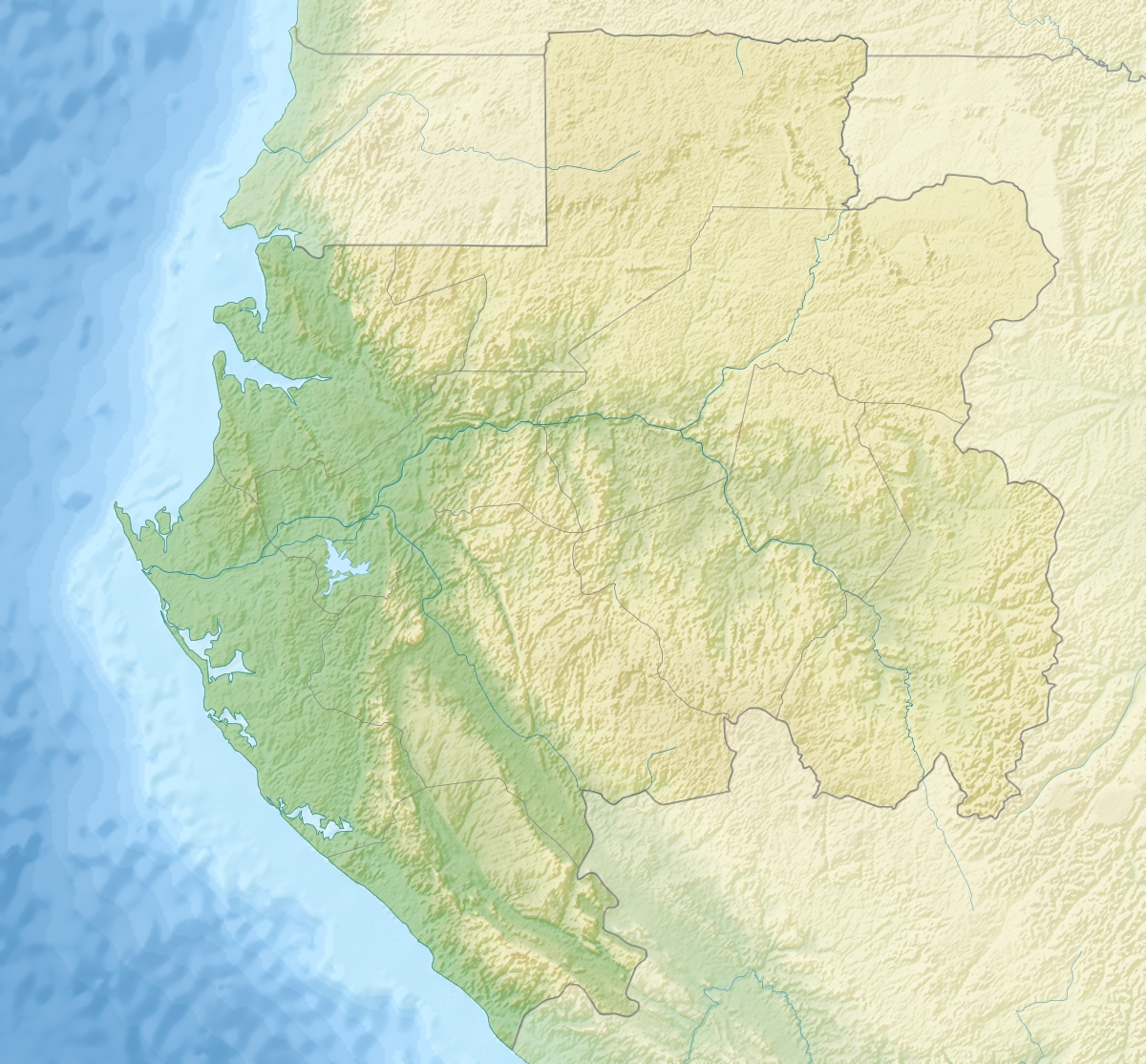
- Location within Gabon

Highest point
- Coordinates: 1°40′29″S 12°1′14″E

Geography
- Location: Gabon

Mont Iboundji is a peak located in Gabon. Claims that it is the highest point of the country, with an altitude of 1,575 metres (5,167 ft), are neither supported by SRTM data nor empirically.

Other sources indicate the Mont Bengoué as the most elevated peak in Gabon.

The mountain is also the namesake of the frontrunners in the Modern Jazz movement, Iboundji.

== See also ==
- Geography of Gabon
