= Tourism in Gabon =

Tourism in Gabon is underdeveloped. Despite this, attractions include beaches, ocean and inland fishing facilities, the falls on the Ogooué River, and the Crystal Mountains. Tourists also come to see the famous hospital founded by Dr. Albert Schweitzer in Lambaréné. Hunting is legal in specific areas from December to September.

== History ==
Until recently, tourism has been neglected, replaced by the export of raw materials such as oil and wood. In 2000, however, the Gabonese government worked on developing the sector by developing luxury and niche tourism, such as bush expeditions or safari trips. The previous December, a postgraduate certificate in tourism was launched at the University of Libreville. The only thing that stops Gabon from success is corruption. The Guardian Book of Statistics rates Gabon as one of the most corrupt countries in the world.

On September 4, 2002, Gabonese president Omar Bongo announced that his country would set aside 10 percent of its land for a national park system. Previously, it had no organization of national parks, working with the Wildlife Conservation Society on conservation issues. Currently, the system comprises over 10,000 square miles (26,000 km^{2}), surpassed only by Costa Rica in the percentage on land area, though in the latter's case the area of conservation is much smaller. These new parks are being developed for ecotourism, as an economic alternative to exploiting Gabon’s forests for lumber. The project was applauded by Dr. Steven Sanderson, president and CEO of the Wildlife Conservation Society, as "one of the most courageous conservation acts in the last 20 years."

== Attractions ==
=== National parks ===
Gabon's 13 national parks range from regions along its coastline, where hippopotamuses play on untouched beaches, to forest clearings home to "naive" gorillas.

== Statistics ==
In 2000, there were about 2,450 hotel rooms in Gabone. Roughly 155,000 tourists arrived that year, and tourism receipts totaled about $7 million. The year before, 120,000 foreigners arrived, with only 1 percent coming for tourism, and it accounted for between one and three percent of the GDP (Gross Domestic Product). A visitor is required to have a passport and visa, except if they are from France, Germany, or several African countries. They are also to provide evidence of yellow fever vaccination. The US Department of State estimated the average daily cost of staying in Gabon's capital of Libreville at $182 per day as of 2002, with expenses elsewhere in the country as low as $70 per day.
