= Bam Bam Amphitheaters =

The Bam Bam Amphitheaters are large erosional ravines found in Wonga-Wongue Presidential Reserve in western Gabon.

Although they are referred to as "cirques," they are unrelated to the glacial cirques of high latitudes and mountains. In Gabon, they are east-facing slopes cut into the Upper Cretaceous to Paleocene sandstones that dip westward beneath the Atlantic Ocean. Because the sandstones are higher and drier than the surrounding coastal plain, they are covered with grasslands rather than the prevailing tropical rain forest. As the sandstones are locally intensely colored, and because the steep slopes tend to be barren, the "cirques" locally appear to be "badlands" similar to those of the American West.
