= List of ecoregions in Gabon =

The following is a list of ecoregions in the Gabon, according to the Worldwide Fund for Nature (WWF).

== Terrestrial ecoregions ==
by major habitat type

=== Tropical and subtropical moist broadleaf forests ===
- Atlantic Equatorial coastal forests
- Northwestern Congolian lowland forests

=== Tropical and subtropical grasslands, savannas, and shrublands ===
- Western Congolian forest–savanna mosaic

=== Mangroves ===
- Central African mangroves

== Freshwater ecoregions ==
by bioregion

=== West Coastal Equatorial ===
- Central West Coastal Equatorial
- Southern West Coastal Equatorial

== Marine ecoregions ==
- Gulf of Guinea Central
