= Gabon Telecom =

Telecommunication company in Gabon

Gabon Telecom SA
- Type: Privately held
- Industry: Telecommunications
- Headquarters: Libreville, Gabon
- Area served: Gabon
- Revenue: 115,900,000,000 Central African CFA franc (2018)
- Parent: Maroc Telecom (since 2007)
- Subsidiaries: Libertis, Mobi Cash

Gabon Telecom SA is the largest telecom company in Gabon. The company manages the country's ccTLD, .ga. It operates about 35,000 land lines, and its cellular phone service subsidiary, Libertis, has 200,000 customers.

In 2007, Maroc Telecom acquired 51% of the company from the government of Gabon. In June 2018, Gabon Telecom launched APS solutions to protect 400,000 IP addresses.

== History ==
Gabon Telecom SA is the national historic telecommunications operator of Gabon, and was originally established as a government-owned business. It was established in 2001 following the division of the Postal and Telecommunications Office, as stipulated by Act No. 004/2001 of 27 June 2001, which reorganized the postal and telecommunications sector. In 2004, it became the sponsor of the .ga ccTLD, the Gabonese top-level web domain.

Following an international tender in February 2007, the Gabonese state sold 51% of the company’s shares to Maroc Telecom. In December 2010, the agreements signed between Maroc Telecom and the Gabonese state in 2008 were finalized. As part of this privatization process, Gabon Telecom transferred administration of the .ga ccTLD back to the Gabonese government.

In March 1999, Gabon Telecom launched Libertis, its mobile brand. In December 2011, Gabon Telecom merged with its subsidiary Mobile Libertis, and in July 2016, it further merged with Atlantic Telecom Gabon (MOOV), a subsidiary of the Etisalat Group. This pooling of resources was completed by the end of 2016.

== Operations ==
Gabon Telecom provides a wide range of services, including fixed telephony (voice and data), mobile telephony, and broadband internet. It remains the only fixed telephony operator in Gabon and operates mobile services under the Libertis and Moov brands. These mobile services include prepaid, postpaid, voice, data services, and international roaming.

The company also offers broadband internet access through its wired network, particularly ADSL, and benefits from access to the SAT-3 submarine cable to meet international bandwidth needs. This enables Gabon Telecom to provide international internet and voice services to other telecom operators.
