= .ga =

Internet country code top-level domain for Gabon

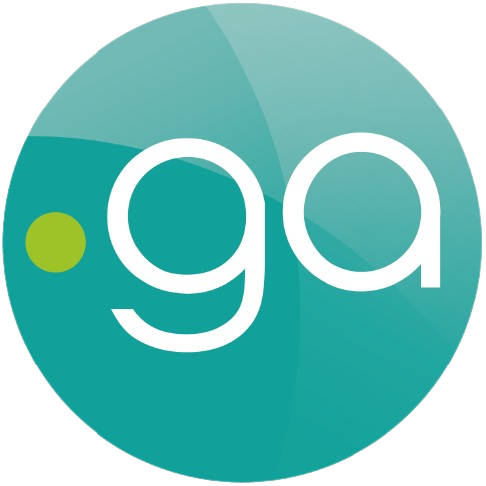
- Introduced: 12 December 1994
- TLD type: Country code top-level domain
- Status: Active
- Registry: ANINF
- Sponsor: ANINF
- Intended use: Entities connected with Gabon
- Actual use: Sees some use in Gabon and relatively rare use as a general-purpose domain
- Registration restrictions: Must have presence in Gabon or justify any other direct or indirect link with Gabon. Geographical names and names associated with public/government entities prohibited.
- Structure: Registrations are available directly at second level
- Documents: Naming Charter (French); Policies (French)
- Dispute policies: UDRP
- DNSSEC: Yes
- Registry website: mon.ga

.ga is the country code top-level domain (ccTLD) for Gabon.

== History ==
Logo in use under Freenom

Between 1998 and 2004 it was administered by the Office des Postes et Télécommunications de la République Gabonaise and then transferred to Gabon Telecom. Gabon Telecom in 2013 formed a partnership with international domain registrar Freenom to offer registrations of this domain for free.

Since 2013, the Agence Nationale des Infrastructures Numériques et des Fréquences (ANINF) of Gabon is responsible for the .ga domain.

In 2023, ANINF terminated their contract with Freenom because it found Freenom's service unsatisfactory. ANINF stated that upwards of seven million .ga domains would be deleted, as "the previous operator has not provided the data that concern them."

The migration was carried out from 4 June to 7 June 2023. With this migration, free domain registration was removed.

The technical operation is handled by AFNIC and domains are sold through accredited registrars.

=== Kim Dotcom controversy ===
Kim Dotcom attempted to use me.ga as an alternative domain for the Megaupload service. It was suspended by Communications Minister Blaise Louembe who stated

"Gabon cannot serve as a platform or screen for committing acts aimed at violating copyrights, nor be used by unscrupulous people."

== Second-level domain names ==
Second-level domain names that end in .ga are:

Domain	Intended purpose
.gouv.ga	Government
.gov.ga	Government
.co.ga	Commercial organizations
.edu.ga	Universities and other educational institutes
.univ.ga	Universities and other educational institutes
