= Mont Bengoué =

Mountain in Gabon

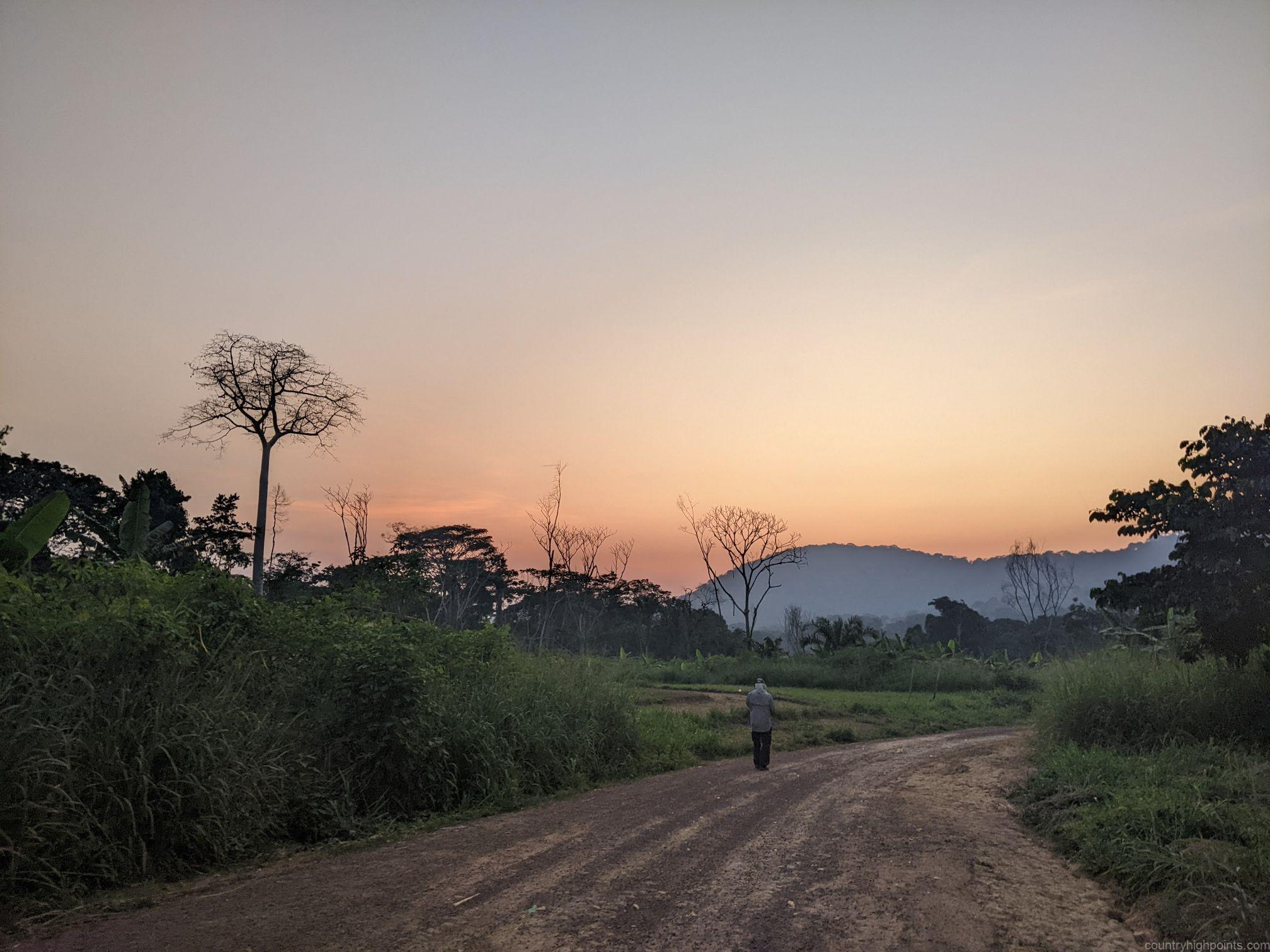
- Mont Bengoué in 2022

Highest point
- Elevation: 1,070 m (3,510 ft)
- Listing: Country high point
- Coordinates: 0°57′00″N 13°41′00″E

Geography
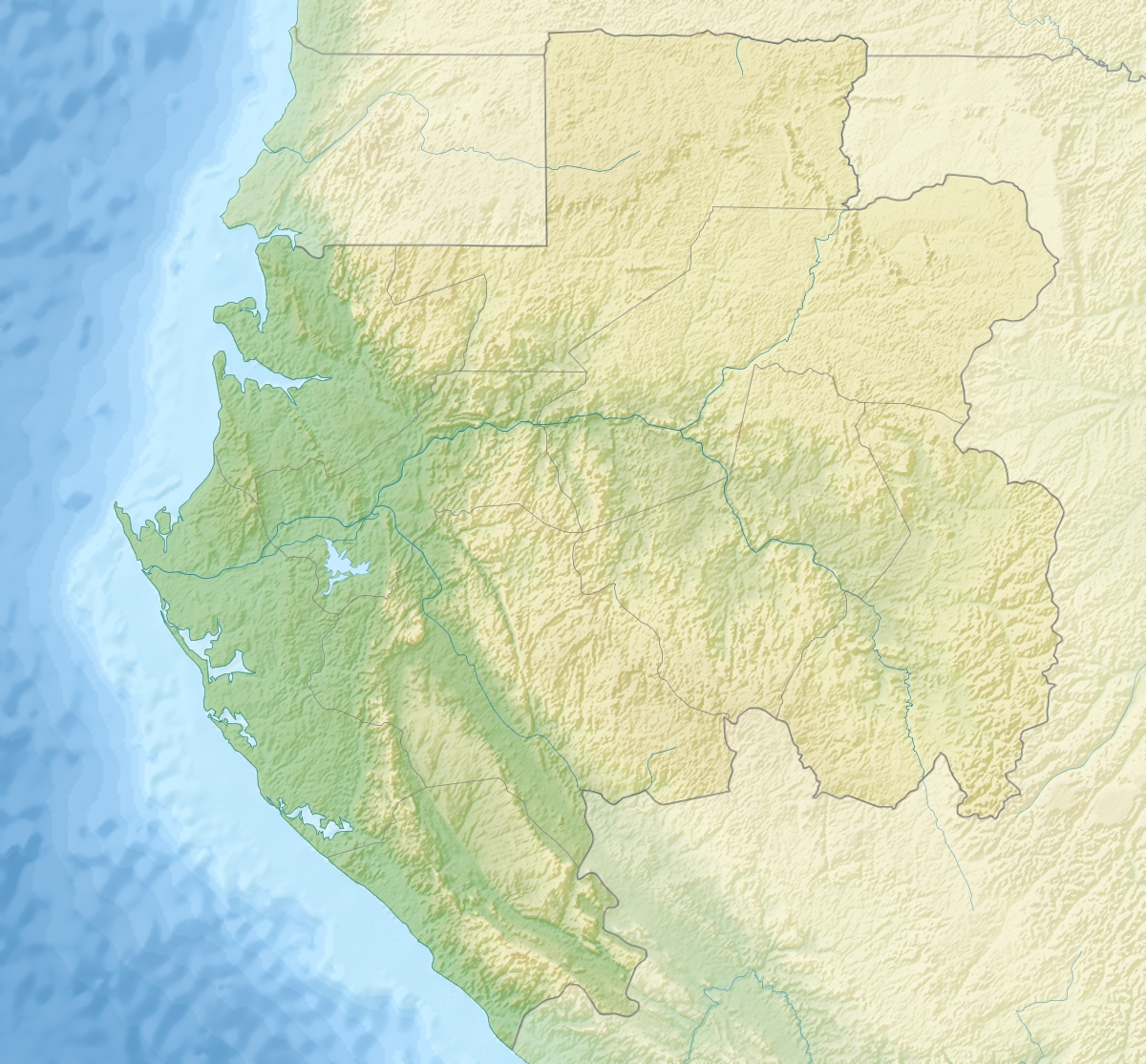
- Location within Gabon
- Country: Gabon

Mont Bengoué is the highest mountain in Gabon. Mont Bengoué is located in the Ogooué-Ivindo Province, at an elevation of 1,070 m (3,510 ft).

== See also ==
- Mont Iboundji
