= Radio Télévision Gabonaise =

National television broadcaster of Gabon

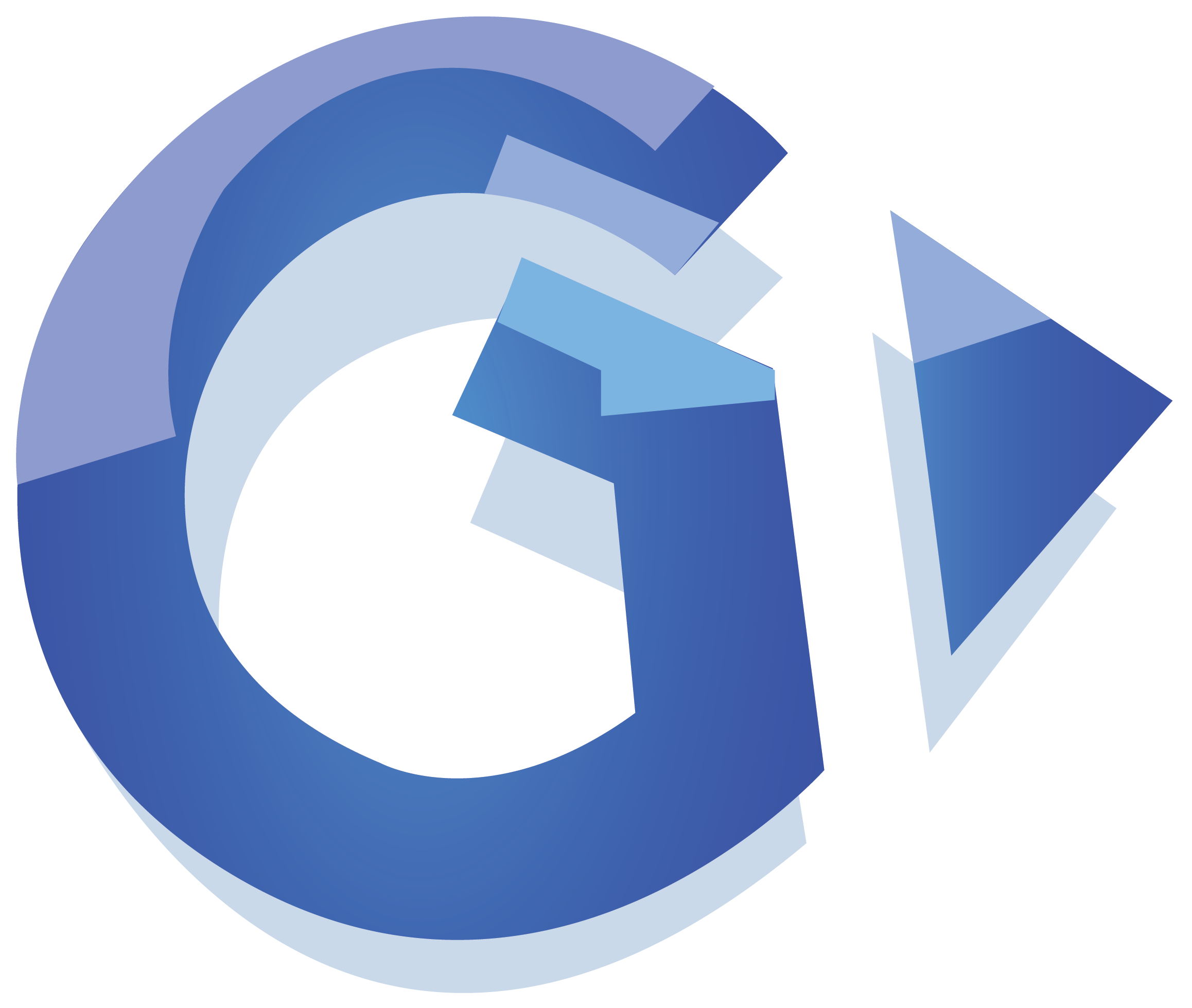
- Type: Broadcast
- Country: Gabon
- Availability: National
- Owner: Government of Gabon

Radio Télévision Gabonaise (RTG) is the national broadcaster of the Central African state of Gabon. Radio Télévision Gabonaise is headquartered in Gabon's capital city, Libreville.

It was established on 28 November 1959 with the start of Radio-Gabon. Television broadcasts started on 9 May 1963 through channel 3 on Libreville while in November 1965 a new station opened on Port-Gentil (channel 10). An additional television station operates in Franceville.

A large radio station is operated in Oyem. Radio Télévision Gabonaise achieved nationwide radio coverage in the late 1980s through a network of smaller provincial stations.

The name was changed in 2012 to Gabon Télévision.

== History ==
Television broadcasts began on 9 May 1963 with an OCORA contract similar to the one used to open Télé Congo a few months earlier. The station was initially known as Télé Gabon.

== See also ==
- Media of Gabon
