= Gabonese passport =

Passport issued to citizens of Gabon

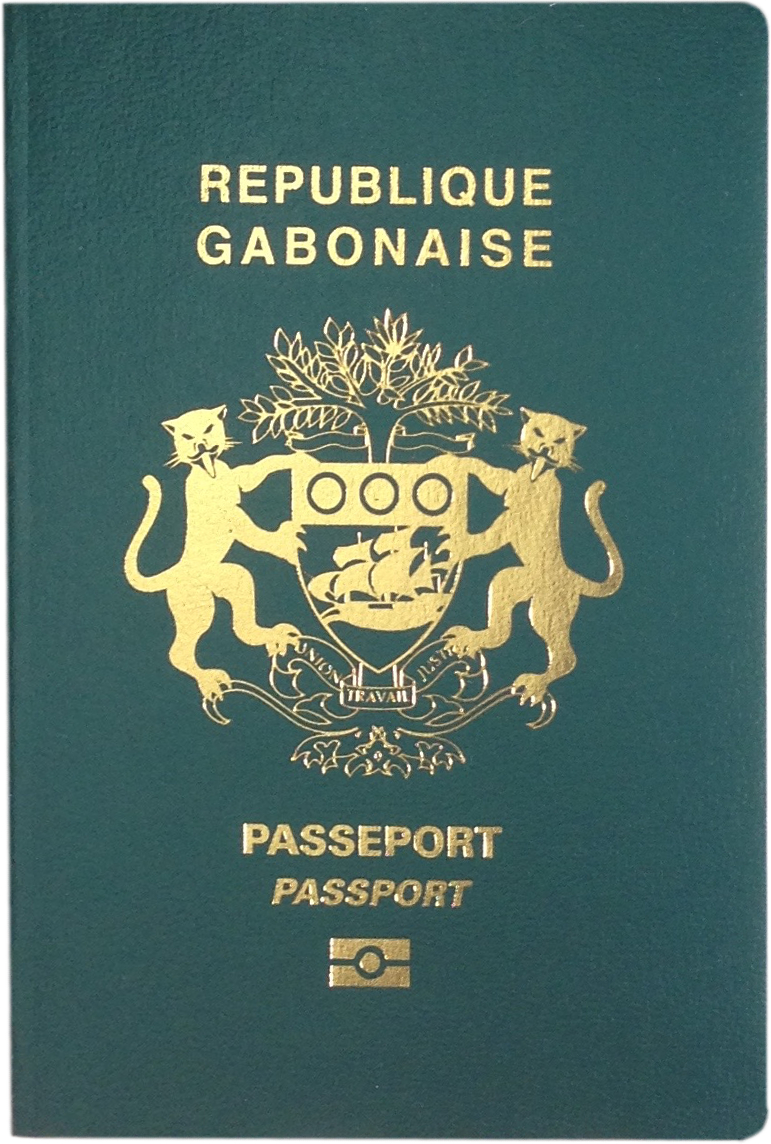
- Front cover of the current Gabonese passport (with chip)
- Type: Biometric passport
- Issued by: Gabon
- Purpose: Identification
- Eligibility: Gabonese citizenship

Non-biometric passport of Gabon

Gabonese passports are issued to Gabonese citizens to travel outside Gabon.

As of 1 January 2017, Gabonese citizens had visa-free or visa on arrival access to 50 countries and territories, ranking the Gabonese passport 86th in terms of travel freedom (tied with Haitian and Malagasy passports) according to the Henley visa restrictions index.

== See also ==
- Visa requirements for Gabonese citizens
- List of passports
