= Foreign relations of Gabon =

Gabon has followed a non-aligned policy, advocating dialogue in international affairs and recognizing both parts of divided countries. Since 1973, the number of countries establishing diplomatic relations with Gabon has doubled. In inter-African affairs, Gabon espouses development by evolution rather than revolution and favors regulated free enterprise as the system most likely to promote rapid economic growth. Concerned about stability in Central Africa and the potential for intervention, Gabon has been directly involved with mediation efforts in Chad, Central African Republic, Republic of Congo, Angola, and former Zaire. In December 1999, through the mediation efforts of President Bongo, a peace accord was signed in the Republic of Congo between the government and most leaders of an armed rebellion. President Bongo has remained involved in the continuing Congolese peace process. Gabon has been a strong proponent of regional stability, and Gabonese armed forces played an important role in the UN Peacekeeping Mission to the Central African Republic (MINURCA).

Gabon is a member of the UN and some of its specialized and related agencies, including the World Bank; Organisation of African Unity (OAU); Central African Customs Union (UDEAC/CEMAC); EC association under Lomé Convention; Communaute Financiere Africaine (CFA); Organisation of Islamic Cooperation (OIC); Non-Aligned Movement; Organization of Petroleum Exporting Countries (OPEC).

Gabon is also a member of the International Criminal Court with a Bilateral Immunity Agreement of protection for the US-military (as covered under Article 98).

== Diplomatic relations ==
List of countries which Gabon maintains diplomatic relations with:

#	Country	Date
1	Japan	17 August 1960
2	United States	17 August 1960
3	France	18 August 1960
4	Belgium	3 October 1960
5	Israel	15 November 1960
6	United Kingdom	9 December 1960
7	Netherlands	24 August 1961
8	Luxembourg	1 December 1961
9	Canada	February 1962
10	Germany	13 April 1962
11	Lebanon	24 September 1962
12	South Korea	1 October 1962
13	Republic of the Congo	November 1962
14	Cameroon	1 February 1963
15	Turkey	1 February 1963
16	Italy	6 February 1963
17	Chad	3 September 1963
18	Mali	30 October 1963
19	Sudan	1963
—	Sovereign Military Order of Malta	1963
20	Switzerland	11 February 1964
21	Spain	25 February 1964
22	Central African Republic	26 March 1964
23	Sweden	May 1965
24	Norway	28 September 1965
25	Burkina Faso	11 November 1965
26	Denmark	22 February 1966
27	India	16 July 1966
28	Ivory Coast	30 December 1966
—	Holy See	31 October 1967
29	Ethiopia	1967
30	Niger	22 April 1968
31	Senegal	17 May 1968
32	Togo	21 June 1968
33	Equatorial Guinea	1968
34	Benin	29 October 1969
35	Democratic Republic of Congo	28 January 1970
36	Austria	1 April 1970
37	Tunisia	10 July 1971
38	Morocco	12 July 1972
39	Romania	21 September 1972
40	Nigeria	18 January 1973
41	Egypt	9 April 1973
42	Algeria	8 September 1973
43	Serbia	4 October 1973
44	Russia	15 October 1973
45	Libya	1 November 1973
46	United Arab Emirates	6 January 1974
47	Brazil	11 January 1974
48	Argentina	22 January 1974
49	North Korea	29 January 1974
50	Saudi Arabia	January 1974
51	Pakistan	February 1974
52	Cuba	26 March 1974
53	China	20 April 1974
54	Greece	April 1974
55	Albania	16 November 1974
56	Iran	26 November 1974
57	Vietnam	9 January 1975
58	Portugal	30 January 1975
59	Liberia	17 June 1975
60	Uganda	4 July 1975
61	Syria	18 July 1975
62	Zambia	18 July 1975
63	Kuwait	27 October 1975
64	Bahrain	8 November 1975
65	Venezuela	11 November 1975
66	São Tomé and Príncipe	1975
67	Mexico	10 March 1976
68	Thailand	1 April 1976
69	Bulgaria	15 May 1976
70	Philippines	6 July 1976
71	Kenya	10 July 1976
72	Czech Republic	4 October 1976
73	Poland	16 October 1976
74	Burundi	23 October 1976
75	Guinea	30 October 1976
76	Bangladesh	1976
77	Rwanda	1976
78	Chile	29 September 1978
79	Angola	26 April 1979
80	Qatar	25 November 1979
81	Ecuador	11 November 1980
82	Oman	30 March 1981
83	Colombia	14 July 1981
84	Ghana	September 1981
85	Haiti	14 October 1981
86	Indonesia	3 June 1982
87	Uruguay	14 June 1982
88	Mauritius	August 1983
89	Australia	19 September 1983
90	Nepal	17 June 1985
91	Yemen	21 August 1985
92	Cambodia	1985
93	Finland	1 July 1988
94	Cyprus	21 October 1988
95	Hungary	24 October 1988
—	State of Palestine	7 April 1989
96	Zimbabwe	27 August 1990
97	South Africa	15 October 1992
98	Ukraine	1 September 1993
99	Lithuania	3 March 1994
100	Armenia	9 March 1994
101	Slovakia	14 July 1994
102	Jamaica	23 October 1995
103	Azerbaijan	1 October 1996
104	Latvia	31 October 1996
105	Seychelles	14 November 1996
106	Belarus	5 December 1996
107	Slovenia	11 December 1996
108	Brunei	June 1997
109	North Macedonia	13 November 2000
110	Croatia	22 October 2001
111	Malaysia	2001
112	Iceland	27 March 2005
113	Andorra	28 March 2006
114	Botswana	21 December 2006
115	Singapore	6 February 2007
116	Estonia	13 July 2007
117	Maldives	20 March 2008
118	Kazakhstan	23 May 2009
119	Ireland	15 December 2009
120	Monaco	28 March 2011
121	Georgia	19 September 2011
122	Bosnia and Herzegovina	21 September 2011
123	Namibia	17 October 2012
124	Montenegro	12 November 2012
125	Mozambique	5 December 2012
126	Cape Verde	7 December 2012
—	Kosovo	9 March 2014
127	Mongolia	15 September 2014
128	Saint Kitts and Nevis	5 January 2018
129	Dominican Republic	17 March 2021
130	Sri Lanka	19 March 2021
131	Nicaragua	14 June 2021
132	Gambia	1 September 2021
133	Tuvalu	24 June 2022
134	Guatemala	31 December 2022
135	Dominica	14 March 2023
136	Peru	3 August 2023
137	Belize	17 September 2025
138	Kyrgyzstan	23 September 2025
139	Djibouti	24 June 2026
140	Tanzania	6 July 2026
141	Tajikistan	24 September 2026
142	Trinidad and Tobago	25 September 2026
143	Eswatini	Unknown
144	Guinea-Bissau	Unknown
145	Iraq	Unknown
146	Mauritania	Unknown
147	Sierra Leone	Unknown

== Bilateral relations ==
Country	Formal Relations Began	Notes
Canada	February 1962	Both countries established diplomatic relations in February 1962: Gabon has an embassy in Ottawa, and has sent ambassadors since 1971.; Canada is accredited to Gabon from its embassy in Yaoundé, Cameroon.
China	20 April 1974	See China–Gabon relations On 20 April 1974, China established diplomatic relations with Gabon.: China has an embassy in Libreville.; Gabon has an embassy in Beijing.
France	18 August 1960	See France–Gabon relations Both countries established diplomatic relations on 18 August 1960 Since independence, Gabon has been "one of France's closest allies in Africa". As of 2008, around 10,000 French nationals lived and worked in Gabon, while the 6th Marine Infantry Battalion of the French military is also stationed there.: France has an embassy in Libreville and a consulate-general in Port-Gentil.; Gabon has an embassy in Paris.
India		See Gabon–India relations: India has an honorary consulate in Libreville.; Gabon has an embassy in New Delhi.
Mexico	10 March 1976	Both countries established diplomatic relations on 10 March 1976: Gabon is accredited to Mexico from its embassy in Washington, D.C., United States.; Mexico is accredited to Gabon from its embassy in Abuja, Nigeria.
South Korea	1 October 1962	See Gabon–South Korea relations Both countries established diplomatic relations on 1 October 1962
Spain	25 February 1964	See Gabon–Spain relations Both countries established diplomatic relations on 25 February 1964: Gabon has an embassy in Madrid.; Spain has an embassy in Libreville.
Turkey	1 February 1963	See Gabon–Turkey relations Both countries established diplomatic relations on 1 February 1963 when accredited first Ambassador of Turkey to Gabon (resident in Lagos) Fehmi Nuza.: Gabon has an embassy in Ankara.; Turkey has an embassy in Libreville.; Trade volume between the two countries was US$38.9 million in 2018.
United Kingdom	9 December 1960	See Gabon–United Kingdom relations Gabon established diplomatic relations with the United Kingdom on 9 December 1960.: Gabon maintains a high commission in London.; The United Kingdom is accredited to Gabon through an honorary consul in Libreville.; Both countries share common membership of the Atlantic Co-operation Pact, Commonwealth, the International Criminal Court, and the World Trade Organization.
United States	17 August 1960	Both countries established diplomatic relations on 17 August 1960 See Gabon–United States relations Embassy of Gabon in Washington, D.C. Relations between the United States and Gabon are excellent. In 1987, President Omar Bongo made an official visit to Washington, DC. In September 2002, Secretary of State Colin Powell made a brief but historic visit to Gabon to highlight environmental protection and conservation in the Central Africa region. This was followed by a visit to the White House by President Bongo in May 2004. The United States imports a considerable percentage of Gabonese crude oil and manganese, and exports heavy construction equipment, aircraft, and machinery to Gabon. Through a modest International Military Education and Training program, the United States provides military training to members of the Gabonese armed forces each year. Other bilateral assistance includes the funding of small grants for qualified democracy and human rights, self-help, and cultural preservation projects. U.S. private capital has been attracted to Gabon since before its independence.: Gabon has an embassy in Washington, D.C.; United States has an embassy on Libreville.

== See also ==
- List of diplomatic missions in Gabon
- List of diplomatic missions of Gabon
