= Visa requirements for Gabonese citizens =

Administrative entry restrictions

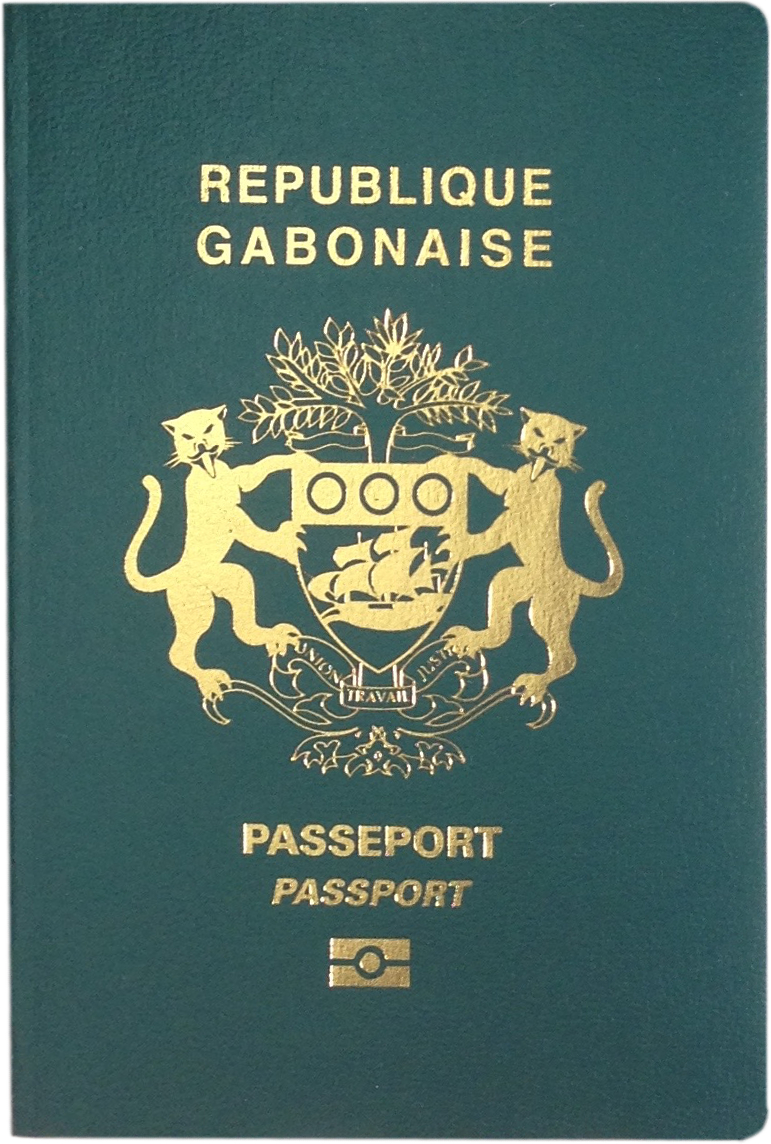
A Gabonese passport

Visa requirements for Gabonese citizens are administrative entry restrictions by the authorities of other states placed on citizens of the Gabon.

As of 2026, Gabonese citizens had visa-free or visa on arrival access to 55 countries and territories, ranking the Gabonese passport 77th, in the world according to the Henley Passport Index.

== Visa requirements map ==
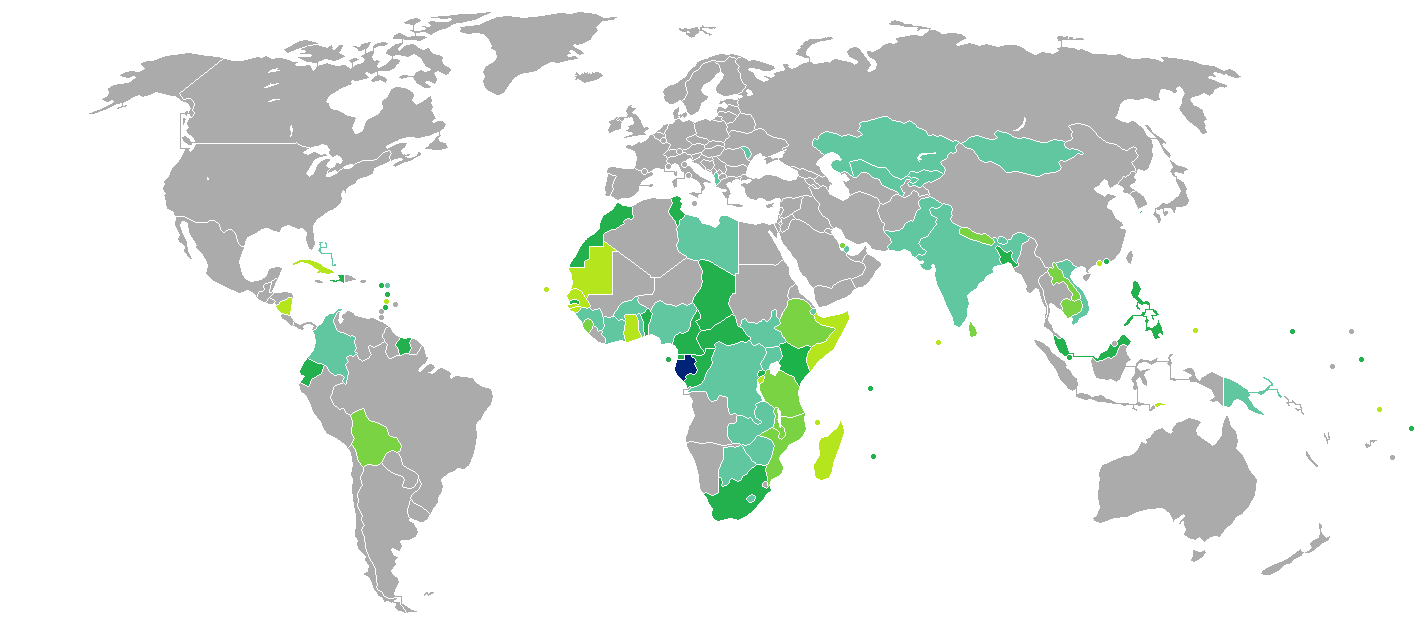
Visa requirements for Gabonese citizens holding ordinary passports Gabon Visa not required Visa on arrival eVisa Visa available both on arrival or online Visa required

== Visa requirements ==
Country	Visa requirement	Allowed stay	Notes (excluding departure fees)
Afghanistan	eVisa		Visa is not required in case born in Afghanistan or can proof that one of their parents is a national of Afghanistan or born in Afghanistan.; e-Visa : Visitors must arrive at Kabul International (KBL).
Albania	eVisa		
Algeria	Visa required		
Andorra	Visa required		No border checkpoints in Andorra, but visitor must visit Spain or France before can reach Andorra, thus Schengen visa required
Angola	Visa required		
Antigua and Barbuda	eVisa		
Argentina	Visa required		The AVE (High Speed Travel) is open to Gabonese citizens holding valid, current ordinary passports traveling to Argentina for tourism. To do so, they must hold a valid category B2/J/B1/O/P (P1-P2-P3)/E/H-1B visa issued by the United States of America.
Armenia	Visa required		
Australia and territories	Visa required		May apply online (Online Visitor e600 visa).
Austria	Visa required		
Azerbaijan	Visa required		
Bahamas	eVisa		
Bahrain	eVisa / Visa on arrival	14 days	
Bangladesh	Visa not required	90 days	
Barbados	Visa not required	90 days	
Belarus	Visa required		
Belgium	Visa required		
Belize	Visa required		
Benin	Visa not required	90 days	
Bhutan	eVisa		
Bolivia	Online Visa / Visa on arrival	30 days	
Bosnia and Herzegovina	Visa required		
Botswana	eVisa	3 months	
Brazil	Visa required		
Brunei	Visa required		
Bulgaria	Visa required		
Burkina Faso	eVisa		
Burundi	Visa on arrival	1 month	
Cambodia	eVisa / Visa on arrival	30 days	
Cameroon	Visa not required	90 days	
Canada	Visa required		
Cape Verde	Visa on arrival		
Central African Republic	Visa not required	90 days	ID card valid.
Chad	Visa not required	90 days	ID card valid.
Chile	Visa required		
China	Visa required		
Colombia	Online Visa		
Comoros	Visa on arrival	45 days	
Republic of the Congo	Visa not required	90 days (Note: Holders of biometric passports only.)	
Democratic Republic of the Congo	eVisa	7 days	
Costa Rica	Visa required		90 days visa free if holding a valid, multiple-entry visa or residence permit issued by Schengen Area, Ireland, the United Kingdom, the United States or Canada
Côte d'Ivoire	eVisa	3 months	
Croatia	Visa required		
Cuba	Tourist card required	90 days	Can be extended up to 90 days with a fee.
Cyprus	Visa required		
Czech Republic	Visa required		
Denmark	Visa required		
Djibouti	eVisa	90 days	
Dominica	Visa not required	21 days	
Dominican Republic	Visa required		
Ecuador	Visa not required	90 days	
Egypt	Visa required		
El Salvador	Visa required		visa free if hold a valid visa issued by Canada, the United States or a Schengen member states.
Equatorial Guinea	Visa not required	90 days	
Eritrea	Visa required		
Estonia	Visa required		
Eswatini	Visa required		
Ethiopia	eVisa / Visa on arrival	up to 90 days	Visa on arrival is obtainable only at Addis Ababa Bole International Airport.; e-Visa holders must arrive via Addis Ababa Bole International Airport.; e-Visa is available for 30 or 90 days.
Fiji	Visa required		
Finland	Visa required		
France	Visa required		
Gambia	Visa not required	90 days	
Georgia	Visa required		e-Visa available for holders of a valid Schengen visa or a valid visa from any of the OECD member countries; or a valid residence permit of a Schengen or OECD country.
Germany	Visa required		
Ghana	Visa on arrival	30 days	
Greece	Visa required		
Grenada	Visa required		
Guatemala	Visa required		visa free if hold a valid visa issued by Canada, the United States or a Schengen member states.
Guinea	eVisa	90 days	
Guinea-Bissau	Visa on arrival	90 days	
Guyana	Visa required		
Haiti	Visa not required	3 months	
Honduras	Visa required		visa free if hold a valid visa issued by Canada, the United States or a Schengen member states.
Hungary	Visa required		
Iceland	Visa required		
India	eVisa	30 days	e-Visa holders must arrive via 32 designated airports (Note: Ahmedabad; Amritsar; Bagdogra; Bengaluru; Bhubaneswar; Chandigarh; Chennai; Coimbatore; Delhi; Gaya; Goa-Dabolim; Goa-Manohar; Guwahati; Hyderabad; Indore; Jaipur; Kannur; Kochi; Kolkata; Kozhikode; Lucknow; Madurai; Mangaluru; Mumbai; Nagpur; Port Blair; Pune; Surat; Thiruvananthapuram; Tiruchirappalli; Varanasi; Visakhapatnam) or 5 designated seaports. (Note: Chennai; Cochin; Mormugao (Goa); Mumbai; Mangalore); An Indian e-Tourist Visa may only be obtained twice within 1 calendar year.; Foreigners of Pakistani origin or who hold a Pakistani Passport are not eligible for an e-Visa. Foreigners who are not Pakistani nationals, but whose parents or grandparents (either paternal or maternal) were born in, or were permanent residents in Pakistan, are also not eligible for an e-Visa.
Indonesia	Visa required		
Iran	eVisa	30 days	
Iraq	Visa required		
Ireland	Visa required		
Israel	Visa required		
Italy	Visa required		
Jamaica	Visa required		
Japan	Visa required		
Jordan	Visa required		
Kazakhstan	eVisa		
Kenya	Electronic Travel Authorisation	90 days	Applications can be submitted up to 90 days prior to travel and must be submitted at least 3 days in advance.; eTA fee is 32.50 USD.; Proof of reservation at the hotel where visitors plan to stay is required (if staying with friends, an invitation letter is also acceptable).; Yellow fever vaccination certificate is required if coming from endemic countries.
Kiribati	Visa not required	90 days	90 days within any 12 months period.
North Korea	Visa required		
South Korea	Visa required		
Kuwait	Visa required		
Kyrgyzstan	eVisa	60 days	
Laos	eVisa / Visa on arrival	30 days	18 (Note: Savannakhet Airport; Lanetoui - Mengkang (China); Meuangmom - Wan Pong (Myanmar); Banvang - Ban Khok Phai (Thailand); Namngeun - Huay Kon (Thailand); Paksan - Bueng Kan (Thailand); Paktaphan - Pak Saeng (Thailand); Pangmon - Ban Huak (Thailand); Phoudou (Thailand); Dak ta ock - Nam Giang (Vietnam); La Lai (Vietnam); Namkan (Vietnam); Namphao - Cau Treo (Vietnam); Namsoy - Na Meo (Vietnam); Naphao - Cha Lo (Vietnam); Pahang - Long Sap (Vietnam); Panghok - Tây Trang (Vietnam); Phoukeua - Bo Y (Vietnam)) of the 33 border crossings are only open to regular visa holders.; e-Visa may be used to enter Laos through the Luang Prabang, Pakse and Vientiane international airports, 3 Thai-Lao Friendship Bridges (Note: Vientiane (Friendship Bridge 1); Savannakhet (Friendship Bridge 2); Bokeo (Friendship Bridge 4)), in Boten (road and railroad), and in Vientiane (at Khamsavath railway station).; Visa on arrival is available at the Luang Prabang, Pakse and Vientiane international airports, 4 Thai-Lao Friendship Bridges (Note: Vientiane (Friendship Bridge 1); Savannakhet (Friendship Bridge 2); Khammouane (Friendship Bridge 3); Bokeo (Friendship Bridge 4)) and 7 border crossings. (Note: Nongnokkheane - Trapeang Kriel (Cambodia); Boten - Bo han (China); Golden Triangle/Samliemkham (Thailand); Khamsavath railway station (Thailand); Namheuang - Ban Na Kraseng (Thailand); Vang tao - Chongmek (Thailand); Dansavan - Lao Bảo (Vietnam))
Latvia	Visa required		
Lebanon	Visa required		
Lesotho	eVisa		
Liberia	Visa required		
Libya	eVisa		
Liechtenstein	Visa required		
Lithuania	Visa required		
Luxembourg	Visa required		
Madagascar	Visa on arrival	60 days	
Malawi	eVisa / Visa on arrival	90 days	
Malaysia	Visa not required	30 days	
Maldives	Free visa on arrival	30 days	
Mali	Visa required		
Malta	Visa required		
Marshall Islands	Visa required		
Mauritania	Visa on arrival		Available at Nouakchott–Oumtounsy International Airport.
Mauritius	Visa not required	90 days	
Mexico	Visa required		Visa free if hold a valid visa or permanent resident card of the Schengen Area, Canada, Japan, the United Kingdom or the United States
Micronesia	Visa not required	30 days	
Moldova	Visa required		Visa free if they hold a valid residence permit, a valid 'C'-type, or a valid 'D'-type visa issued by a Schengen member state
Monaco	Visa required		
Mongolia	eVisa	30 days	
Montenegro	Visa required		30 days visa free if hold a valid foreign travel documents containing a valid Schengen visa, a valid visa of Commonwealth of Australia, Japan, Canada, New Zealand, Ireland, the United States of America and the United Kingdom
Morocco	Visa not required	90 days	
Mozambique	eVisa / Visa on arrival	30 days	
Myanmar	Visa required		
Namibia	Visa on arrival	90 days	
Nauru	Visa required		
Nepal	Online Visa / Visa on arrival	90 days	
Netherlands	Visa required		
New Zealand	Visa required		Holders of an Australian Permanent Resident Visa or Resident Return Visa may be granted a New Zealand Resident Visa on arrival permitting indefinite stay (pursuant to the Trans-Tasman Travel Arrangement), subject to meeting character requirements and obtaining an Electronic Travel Authority prior to departure.
Nicaragua	Visa on arrival	30 days	
Niger	Visa required		
Nigeria	eVisa	90 days	
North Macedonia	Visa required		15 days visa free if hold a valid Type "C" multiple-entry visa for the Schengen Area or a temporary/permanent residence of the Schengen Area
Norway	Visa required		
Oman	Visa required		
Pakistan	Online Visa	3 months	Online Visa eligible.
Palau	Free visa on arrival	30 days	
Panama	Visa not required	90 days	
Papua New Guinea	eVisa	60 days	Visitors may apply for a visa online under the "Tourist - Own Itinerary" category.
Paraguay	Visa required		
Peru	Visa required		
Philippines	Visa not required	30 days	
Poland	Visa required		
Portugal	Visa required		
Qatar	eVisa		
Romania	Visa required		
Russia	Visa required		
Rwanda	Visa not required	30 days	
Saint Kitts and Nevis	eVisa		
Saint Lucia	Visa on arrival	6 weeks	
Saint Vincent and the Grenadines	Visa not required	3 months	
Samoa	Visa not required	60 days	
San Marino	Visa required		No border checkpoints in San Marino but visitor must visit Italy before can reach San Marino thus Schengen visa required
São Tomé and Príncipe	Visa not required	15 days	
Saudi Arabia	Visa required		
Senegal	Visa on arrival	90 days	
Serbia	Visa required		Holders of valid visa or residents of the Cyprus, Ireland, Schengen Area member states, United Kingdom or the United States may enter Serbia without a visa for a maximum stay of 90 days within any 180-day period
Seychelles	Electronic Border System	3 months	Application can be submitted up to 30 days before travel.; Visitors must upload a reservation confirmation(s) for each visitor's location of stay in Seychelles.; Yellow fever vaccination certificate is required if coming from endemic countries.; Payment of the fee (EUR 10) by credit or debit card.; Valid for one journey only and it expires once exit the country.
Sierra Leone	eVisa / Visa on arrival	3 months / 30 days	
Singapore	Visa not required	30 days	
Slovakia	Visa required		
Slovenia	Visa required		
Solomon Islands	Visa required		
Somalia	Visa on arrival	30 days	
South Africa	Visa not required	30 days	
South Sudan	eVisa		Obtainable online.; Printed visa authorization must be presented at the time of travel.
Spain	Visa required		
Sri Lanka	eVisa / Visa on arrival	60 days / 30 days	
Sudan	Visa required		
Suriname	Visa not required	90 days	An entrance fee of USD 50 or EUR 50 must be paid online prior to arrival.; Multiple entry e-Visa is also available.
Sweden	Visa required		
Switzerland	Visa required		
Syria	Visa required		
Tajikistan	Visa required		
Tanzania	eVisa / Visa on arrival	3 months	
Thailand	Visa required		
Timor-Leste	Visa on arrival	30 days	
Togo	eVisa	15 days	
Tonga	Visa required		
Trinidad and Tobago	Visa required		
Tunisia	Visa not required	3 months	
Turkey	Visa required		
Turkmenistan	Visa required		
Tuvalu	Visa on arrival	1 month	
Uganda	eVisa	3 months	
Ukraine	Visa required		
United Arab Emirates	Visa required		May apply using 'Smart service'.
United Kingdom and Crown dependencies	Visa required		
United States	Visa required		Proof of COVID-19 vaccine required if entering by air.
Uruguay	Visa required		
Uzbekistan	eVisa	30 days	5-day visa-free transit at the international airports if holding a confirmed onward ticket for a flight to a third country.
Vanuatu	Visa required		
Vatican City	Visa required		
Venezuela	Visa required		
Vietnam	eVisa	90 days	30 days visa free when visit Phu Quoc Island
Yemen	Visa required		
Zambia	eVisa	90 days	
Zimbabwe	eVisa	3 months	

== Dependent, Disputed, or Restricted territories ==
Unrecognized or partially recognized countries

Territory	Conditions of access	Notes
Abkhazia	Visa required	
Kosovo	Visa required	Do not need a visa a holder of a valid biometric residence permit issued by one of the Schengen member states or a valid multi-entry Schengen Visa, a holder of a valid Laissez-Passer issued by United Nations Organizations, NATO, OSCE, Council of Europe or European Union a holder of a valid travel documents issued by EU Member and Schengen States, United States of America, Canada, Australia and Japan based on the 1951 Convention on Refugee Status or the 1954 Convention on the Status of Stateless Persons, as well as holders of valid travel documents for foreigners (max. 15 days stay)
Northern Cyprus	Visa not required	
Palestine	Visa not required	Arrival by sea to Gaza Strip not allowed.
Sahrawi Arab Democratic Republic		Undefined visa regime in the Western Sahara controlled territory.
Somaliland	Visa on arrival	30 days for 30 US dollars, payable on arrival.
South Ossetia	Visa not required	Multiple entry visa to Russia and three day prior notification are required to enter South Ossetia.
Taiwan	Visa required	
Transnistria	Visa not required	Registration required after 24h.

Dependent and autonomous territories

Territory	Conditions of access	Notes
China
Hong Kong	Visa not required	14 days
Macau	Visa on arrival	
Denmark
Faroe Islands	Visa required	
Greenland	Visa required	
France
French Guiana	Visa required	
French Polynesia	Visa required	
(France) French West Indies	Visa required	Includes overseas departments of Guadeloupe and Martinique and overseas collectivities of Saint Barthélemy and Saint Martin.
Mayotte	Visa required	
New Caledonia	Visa required	
Réunion	Visa required	
Saint Pierre and Miquelon	Visa required	
Wallis and Futuna	Visa required	
Netherlands
Aruba	Visa required	
Caribbean Netherlands	Visa required	Includes Bonaire, Sint Eustatius and Saba.
Curaçao	Visa required	
Sint Maarten	Visa required	
New Zealand
Cook Islands	Visa not required	31 days
Niue	Visa not required	30 days
Tokelau	Visa required	
United Kingdom
Akrotiri and Dhekelia	Visa required	
Anguilla	Visa required	Holders of a valid visa issued by the United Kingdom do not require a visa.
Bermuda	Visa not required	
British Indian Ocean Territory	Special permit required	Special permit required.
British Virgin Islands	Visa required	
Cayman Islands	Visa required	
Falkland Islands	Visa required	
Gibraltar	Visa required	
Montserrat	eVisa	
Pitcairn Islands	Visa not required	14 days visa free and landing fee 35 USD or tax of 5 USD if not going ashore.
Ascension Island	eVisa	3 months within any year period
Saint Helena	eVisa	
Tristan da Cunha	Permission required	Permission to land required for 15/30 pounds sterling (yacht/ship passenger) for Tristan da Cunha Island or 20 pounds sterling for Gough Island, Inaccessible Island or Nightingale Islands.
South Georgia and the South Sandwich Islands	Permit required	Pre-arrival permit from the Commissioner required (72 hours/1 month for 110/160 pounds sterling).
Turks and Caicos Islands	Visa required	Holders of a valid visa issued by Canada, United Kingdom or the USA do not required a visa for a maximum stay of 90 days.
United States
American Samoa	Visa required	
Guam	Visa required	
Northern Mariana Islands	Visa required	
Puerto Rico	Visa required	
U.S. Virgin Islands	Visa required	
Antarctica and adjacent islands
Special permits required for Bouvet Island, British Antarctic Territory, French Southern and Antarctic Lands, Argentine Antarctica, (Australia) Australian Antarctic Territory, (Antártica Chilena Province) Chilean Antarctic Territory, (Australia) Heard Island and McDonald Islands, (Norway) Peter I Island, (Norway) Queen Maud Land, (New Zealand) Ross Dependency.

== See also ==
- Visa policy of Gabon
- Gabonese passport
