= Gabon–Spain relations =

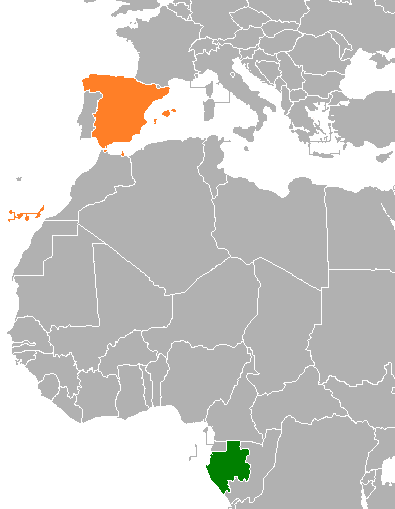
- Gabon: Spain

Gabon–Spain relations are the bilateral and diplomatic relations between these two countries. Gabon has an embassy in Madrid and consulates in Barcelona and Bilbao. Spain has an embassy in Libreville.

== Diplomatic relations ==
Bilateral relations can be described as cordial and without friction points between the two countries. Spain has been a resident embassy in Libreville since 1962, two years after Gabon gained its independence from France in 1960. Although Equatorial Guinea was the part of Spanish colony (Spanish Guinea) from 1778 until its own independence from Spain in 1968, as part of political relations are good, they have traditionally suffered from an absence of visits in one way or another that give greater dynamism and visibility to the bilateral relationship. The image that Spain projects in Gabon is positive in general; Spain is not associated in the collective belief of Gabonese citizens with a colonial State, and Gabonese society appreciates democratic and economic progress since the Transition, considered as an example to be taken into account.

== Economic relations ==
The Trade Balance with Gabon has traditionally been deficient for Spain (€452 million in 2013, 294 million in 2014 and 367 million in 2015). In 2014 and 2015, the value of Spanish imports from Gabon declined substantially as a result, to a large extent, of the fall in the price of oil experienced during those years.

== Cooperation ==
Due to its status as a middle-income country, Gabon does not fall within the framework of AECID cooperation programs, but it did benefit from the scholarship program until 2011 – the last year in which Gabonese students were selected (four).

Until the academic year 2011 – 2012, the AECID kept a reader in the Superior Normal School (ENS), university center for teacher training of language) and for several years there was a second reader in the Omar Bongo University. Both lectorates were suppressed. The Embassy of Spain made arrangements for the restoration of the lecturer at the ENS but this was not restored. However, the Embassy got sponsorships to send a reader to the ENS during the first half of 2016.

There is a strong interest in the study of Spanish, which is expressed in the high number of Gabonese students studying Spanish as a foreign language in the national education system, both in secondary and university. The ENS sends annually to the University of Salamanca a group of students – between 20 and 35 – within the framework of a teaching program for the training of active Spanish teachers since the late 80s. The program combines the improvement of Spanish with methodological training for language teaching. The length of stay varies between 4 and 6 months. According to data provided by the Ministry of National Education to the Embassy, in the 2015/16 academic year there are 111,000 Spanish students in secondary education and 410 teachers.

Within the framework of sports cooperation, there is a bilateral cooperation program signed in 2003 on the occasion of the visit to Spain of the Gabonese Minister of Youth and Sports. The program establishes an annual calendar of sports activities sponsored by the Higher Sports Council, although there are no recent data confirming its validity.

Military cooperation between Spain and Gabon has been reinforced in recent years with the granting by the Spanish Ministry of Defense of some training grants for officers (Spanish language and General Staff course) since the 2014–15 academic year, and especially after the deployment since March 2014 of an aircraft along with a detachment of about 50 troops of the Spanish Air Force to operate from Gabon territory, in support of French forces in the region.

== See also ==
- Foreign relations of Gabon
- Foreign relations of Spain
