= List of diplomatic missions of Gabon =

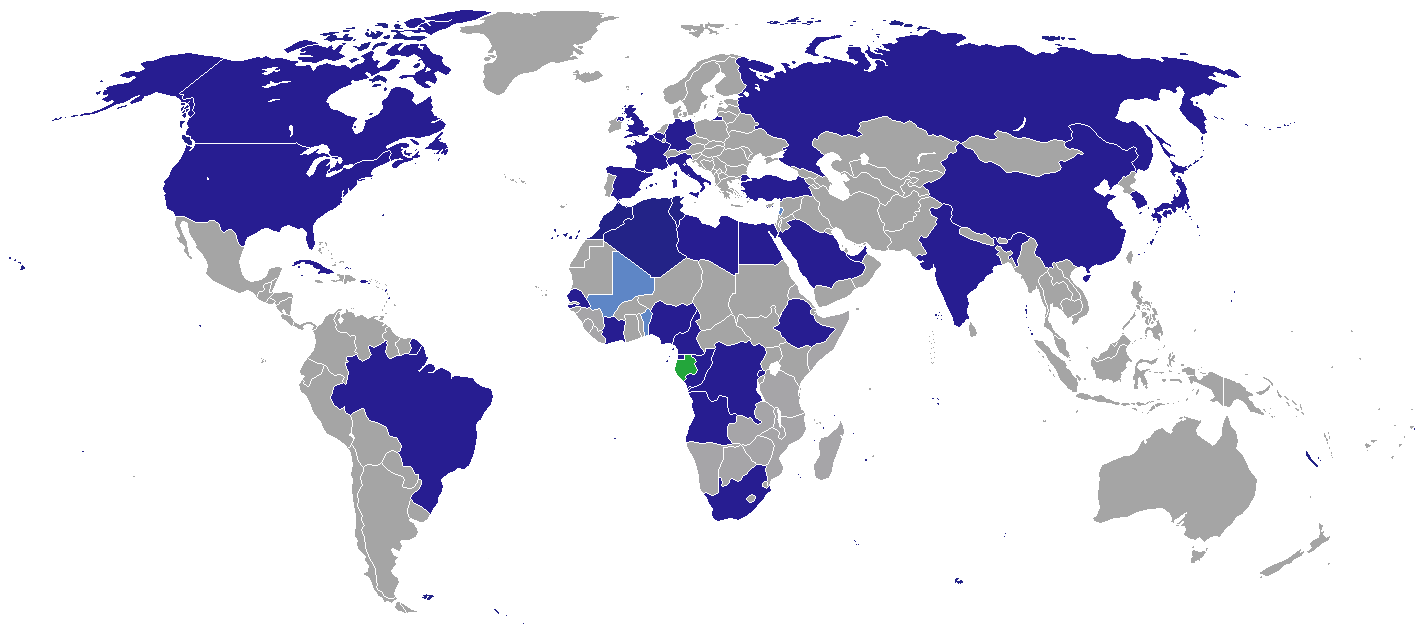
Location of diplomatic missions of Gabon: Gabonese Republic Countries that host Gabonese embassies Countries that host only Gabonese consular missions

This is a list of diplomatic missions of Gabon, excluding honorary consulates.

== Current missions ==
=== Africa ===
Host country	Host city	Mission	Concurrent accreditation	Ref.
Algeria	Algiers	Embassy	Countries: Mauritania	
Angola	Luanda	Embassy	Countries: Namibia; Zambia	
Benin	Cotonou	Consulate-General (Note: Subordinate to the Gabonese Embassy in Lomé.)		
Burkina Faso	Ouagadougou	Embassy		
Cameroon	Yaoundé	High Commission	Countries: Central African Republic; Chad	
Congo-Brazzaville	Brazzaville	Embassy		
Congo-Kinshasa	Kinshasa	Embassy	Countries: Burundi	
Egypt	Cairo	Embassy		
Equatorial Guinea	Malabo	Embassy		
Equatorial Guinea	Bata	Consulate-General		
Ethiopia	Addis Ababa	Embassy	Countries: Kenya; Tanzania; International Organizations: African Union; United Nations Economic Commission for Africa; United Nations Environment Programme; United Nations Human Settlements Programme	
Guinea	Conakry	Embassy		
Ivory Coast	Abidjan	Embassy	Countries: Burkina Faso; Mali; Niger	
Libya	Tripoli	Embassy		
Mali	Bamako	Consulate-General (Note: Subordinate to the Gabonese Embassy in Abidjan.)		
Morocco	Rabat	Embassy	Countries: Palestine	
Morocco	Laayoune	Consulate-General	Countries: Palestine	
Nigeria	Abuja	High Commission		
Rwanda	Kigali	High Commission		
São Tomé and Príncipe	São Tomé	Embassy		
Senegal	Dakar	Embassy	Countries: Cape Verde; Gambia; Guinea; Guinea-Bissau	
South Africa	Pretoria	High Commission	Countries: Botswana; Mozambique	
Togo	Lomé	High Commission	Countries: Benin; Ghana	
Tunisia	Tunis	Embassy		

=== Americas ===
Host country	Host city	Mission	Concurrent accreditation	Ref.
Brazil	Brasília	Embassy	Countries: Chile; Venezuela; Uruguay	
Canada	Ottawa	High Commission		
Cuba	Havana	Embassy		
United States	Washington, D.C.	Embassy	Countries: Haiti; Mexico	
United States	New York City	Consulate-General	Countries: Haiti; Mexico	

=== Asia ===
Host country	Host city	Mission	Concurrent accreditation	Ref.
China	Beijing	Embassy	Countries: North Korea; Singapore; Vietnam	
India	New Delhi	High Commission	Countries: Nepal	
Lebanon	Beirut	Consulate-General		
Japan	Tokyo	Embassy	Countries: Australia; Indonesia; Malaysia; New Zealand	
Saudi Arabia	Riyadh	Embassy	Countries: Bahrain; Kuwait; Oman; Qatar; International Organizations: Organisation of Islamic Cooperation	
Saudi Arabia	Jeddah	Consulate-General	Countries: Bahrain; Kuwait; Oman; Qatar; International Organizations: Organisation of Islamic Cooperation	
South Korea	Seoul	Embassy	Countries: Philippines; Thailand	
Turkey	Ankara	Embassy		
United Arab Emirates	Abu Dhabi	Embassy		

=== Europe ===
Host country	Host city	Mission	Concurrent accreditation	Ref.
Belgium	Brussels	Embassy	Countries: Luxembourg; Netherlands; International Organizations: European Union; Organisation for the Prohibition of Chemical Weapons	
France	Paris	Embassy	Countries: Andorra; Monaco; Portugal; Switzerland; International Organizations: Francophonie	
Germany	Berlin	Embassy	Countries: Austria	
Holy See (Note: The Gabonese Embassy to the Holy See is located outside Vatican territory in Rome.)	Rome	Embassy	Sovereign entity: Sovereign Military Order of Malta	
Italy	Rome	Embassy	Countries: Cyprus; Greece; Israel; International Organizations: Food and Agriculture Organization; International Fund for Agricultural Development; World Food Programme	
Russia	Moscow	Embassy	Countries: Czechia; Latvia; Lithuania; Serbia; Romania; Ukraine	
Spain	Madrid	Embassy	International Organizations: UN Tourism	
United Kingdom	London	High Commission	Countries: Denmark; Finland; Ireland; Norway; Sweden; International Organizations: International Maritime Organization	

=== Multilateral organizations ===
Organization	Host city	Host country	Mission	Concurrent accreditation	Ref.
United Nations	New York City	United States	Permanent Mission	Countries: Guatemala	
United Nations	Geneva	Switzerland	Permanent Mission	International Organizations: World Health Organization; World Trade Organization	
UNESCO	Paris	France	Permanent Mission		

== Gallery ==
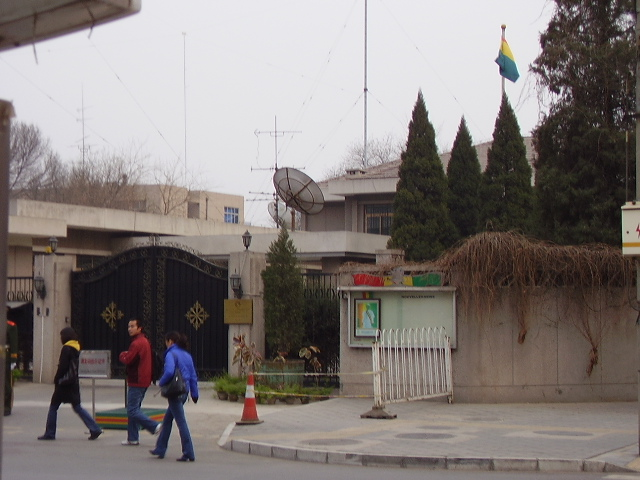
Embassy in Beijing

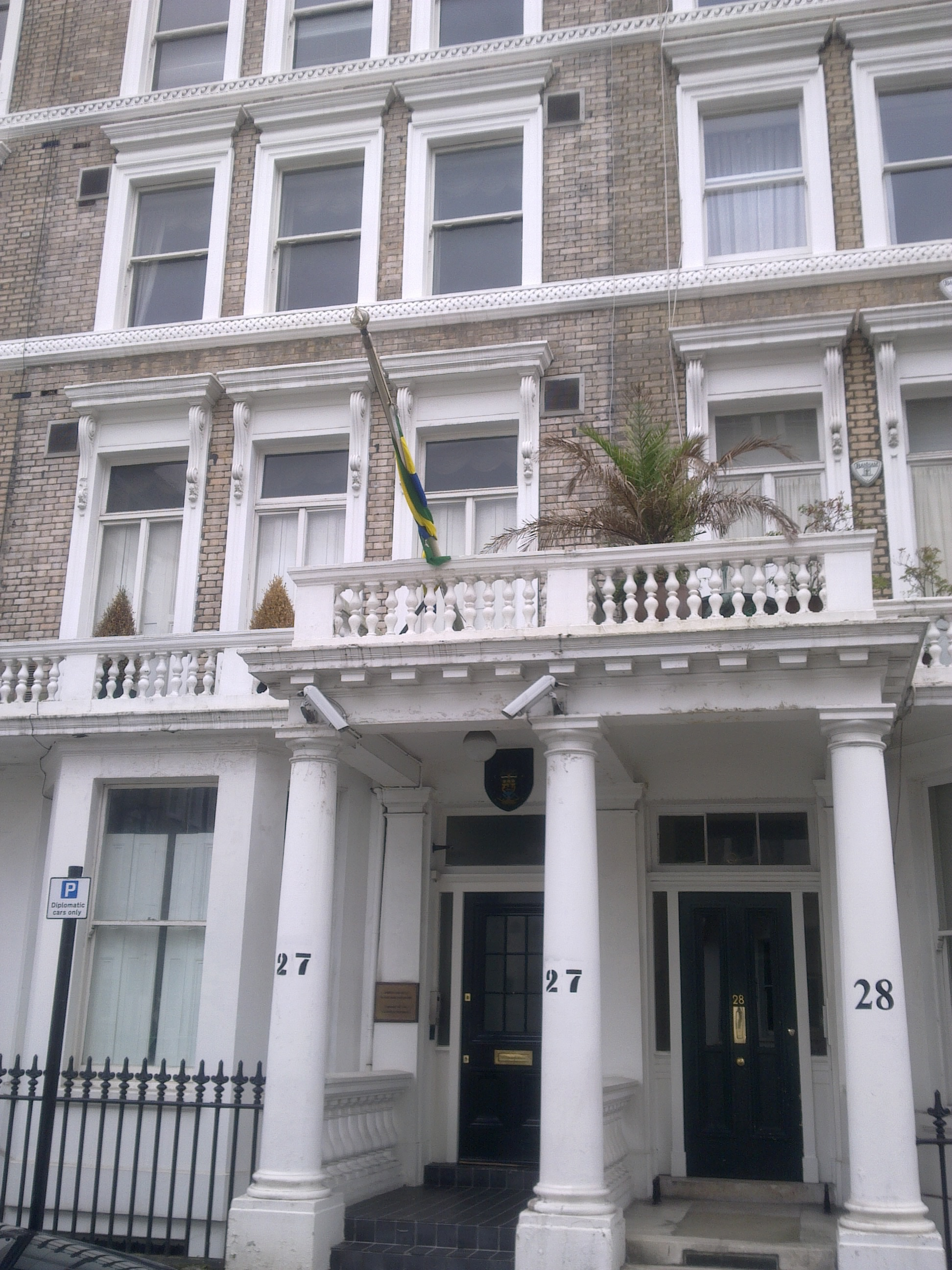
High Commission in London

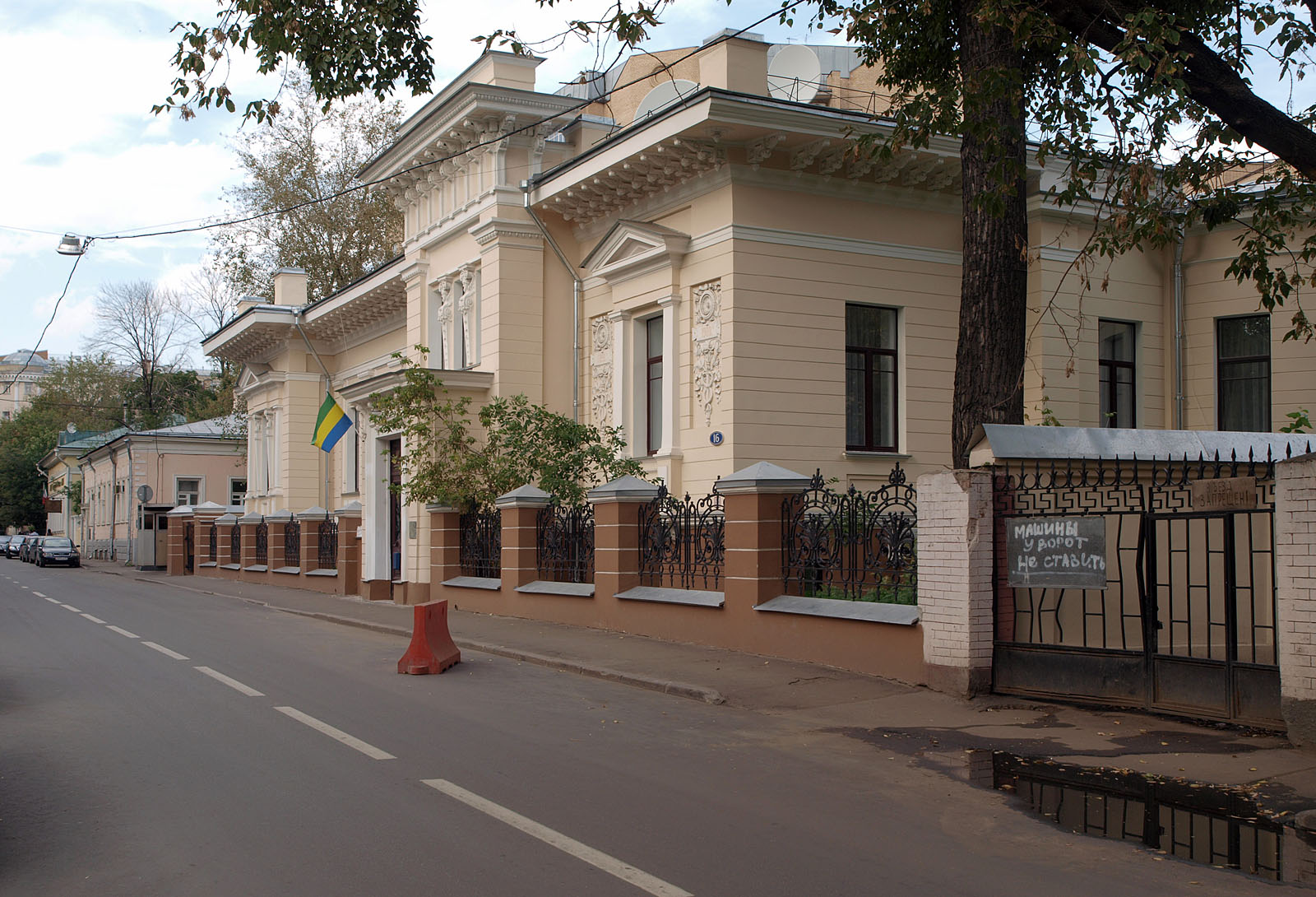
Embassy in Moscow

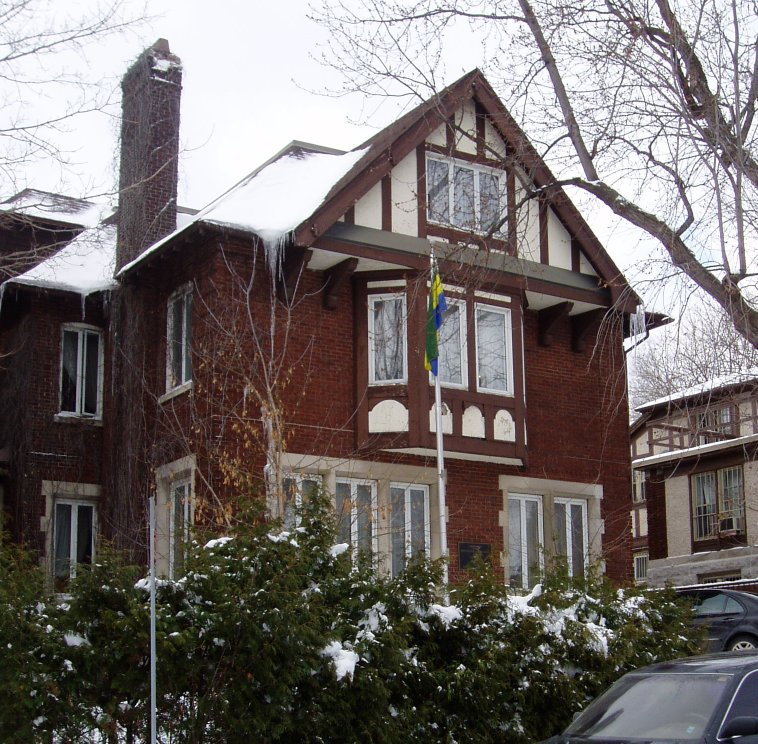
High Commission in Ottawa

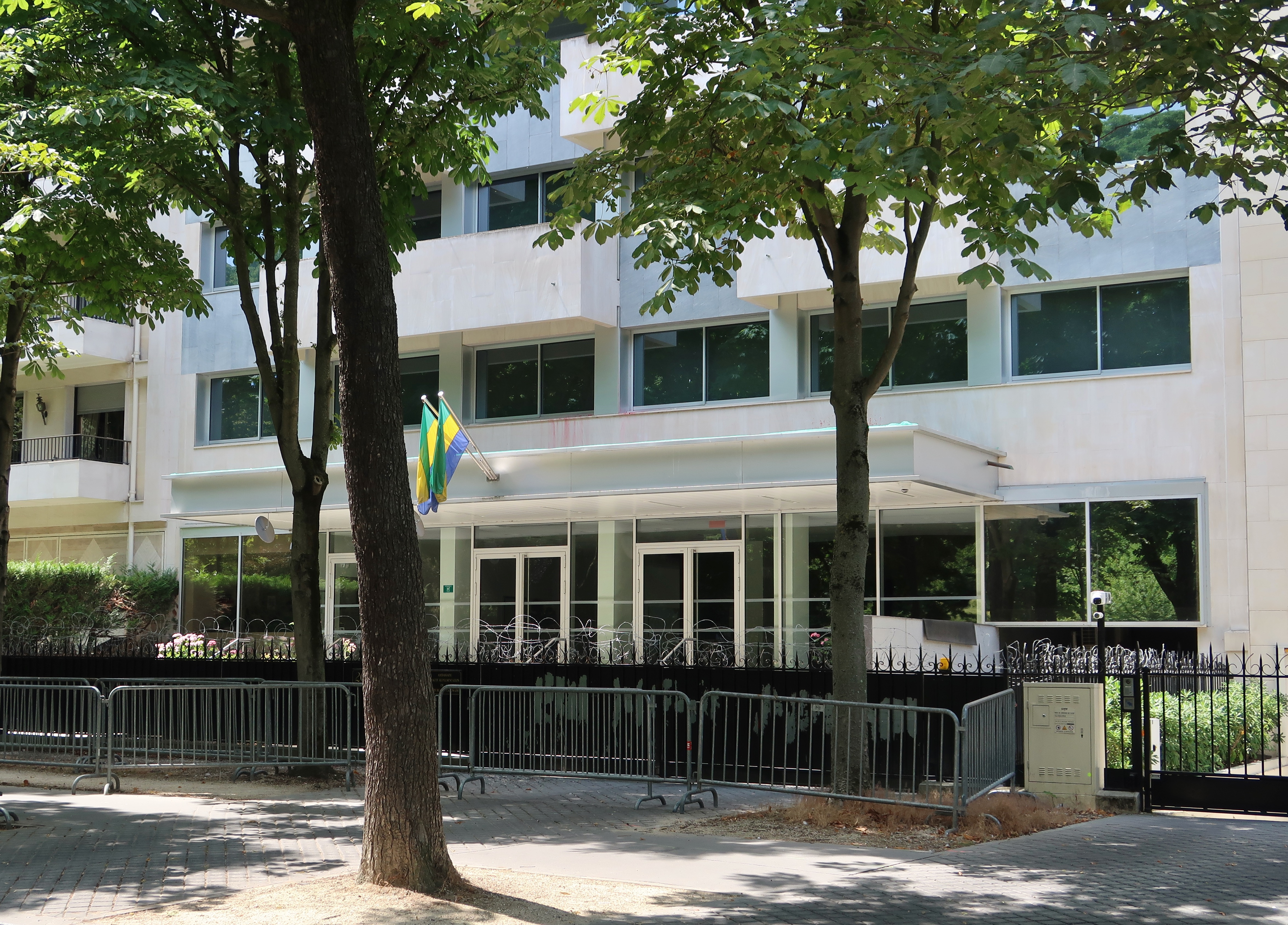
Embassy in Paris

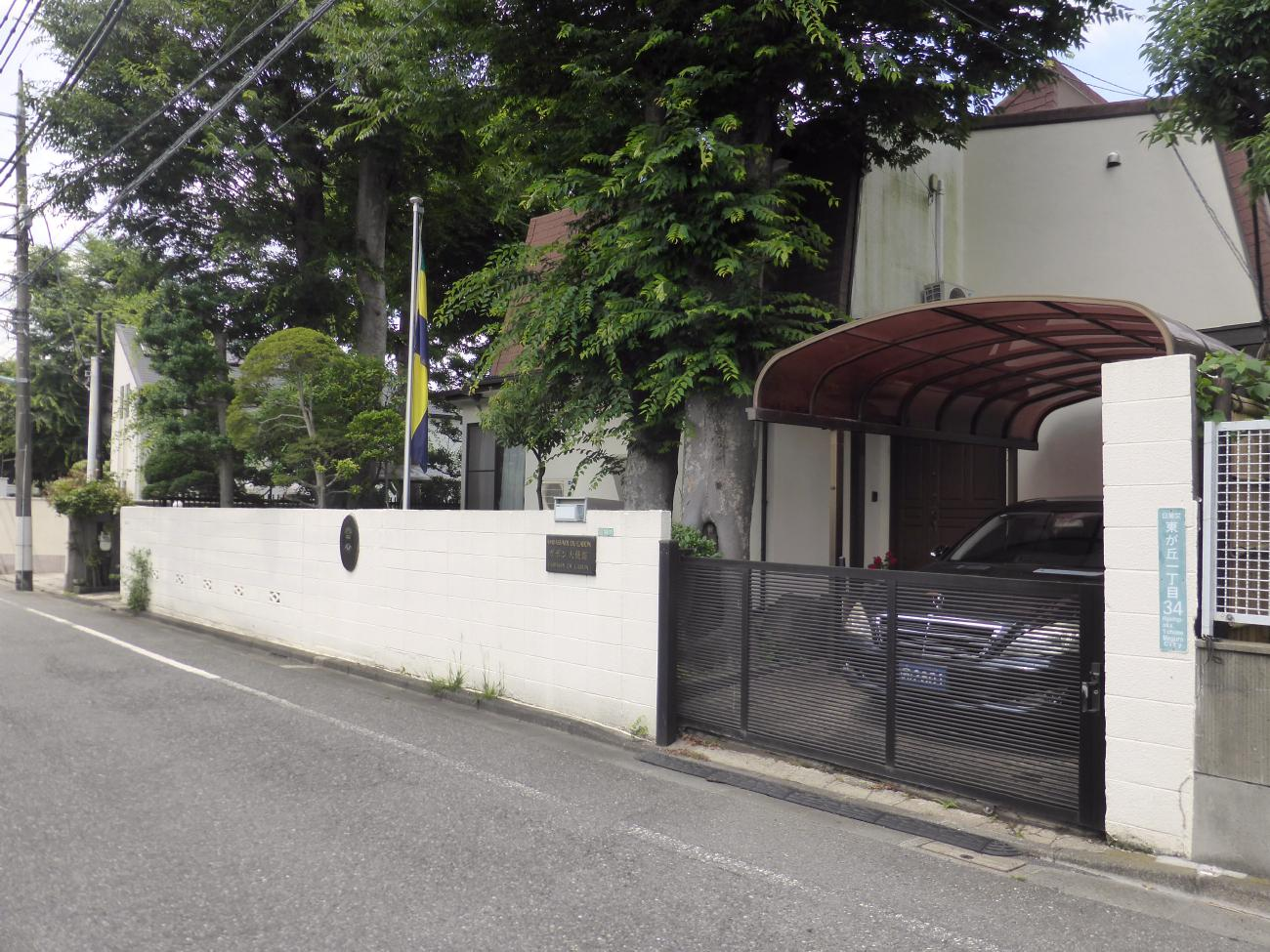
Embassy in Tokyo

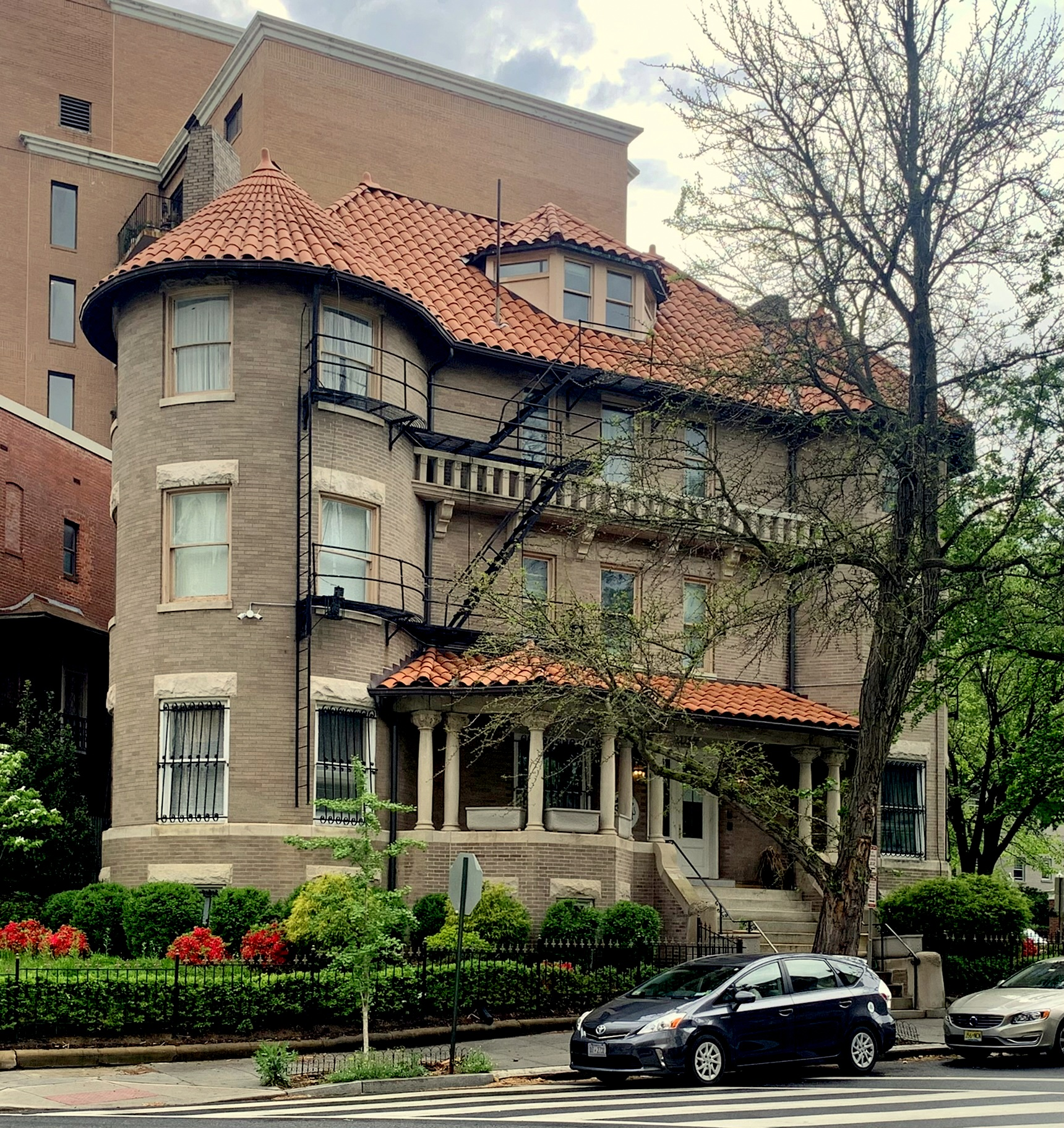
Embassy in Washington, D.C.

== Closed missions ==
=== Asia ===
Host country	Host city	Mission	Year closed	Ref.
Iran	Tehran	Embassy	Unknown	
Philippines	Manila	Embassy	1986	

== See also ==
- Foreign relations of Gabon
- List of diplomatic missions in Gabon
- Visa policy of Gabon
