= Visa policy of Gabon =

Policy on permits required to enter Gabon

Most visitors to Gabon must obtain a visa in advance, either from one of the Gabonese diplomatic missions or online, unless if they are a citizen of one of the visa-exempt countries.

== Visa policy map ==
Visa policy of Gabon Gabon Visa not required (90 days) Visa not required (30 days) eVisa Visa required - only with an authorization Visa issuance suspended

== Visa exemption ==
According to the Ministry of Foreign Affairs of Gabon, citizens of the following countries do not require a visa to enter Gabon, for visits up to the duration listed below:

90 days

- Cameroon
- Central African Republic
- Republic of Congo
- Chad
- Equatorial Guinea
- Morocco

30 days

- Mauritius
- South Africa^{E}

_{E - Length of stay extendable to 90 days.}

Date of visa changes

Visa-free

- 7 February 2013: Mauritius
- 5 September 2013: Morocco
- 19 October 2017: CEMAC countries - Cameroon, Central African Republic, Congo, Chad and Equatorial Guinea (Note: Under CEMAC agreement on 14 June 2013)
- 20 February 2023: G20 countries
- On or before 27 March 2023: Malaysia, Panama, São Tomé and Príncipe, Singapore, South Africa

Visa on arrival

- 12 October 2017: Australia, Austria, Argentina, Belgium, Brazil, Bulgaria, Canada, China, Croatia, Cyprus, Czech Republic, Denmark, Estonia, Finland, France, Germany, Greece, Hungary, India, Indonesia, Ireland, Italy, Japan, Latvia, Lithuania, Luxembourg, Malta, Mexico, Netherlands, Poland, Portugal, Romania, Russia, Saudi Arabia, Slovakia, Slovenia, South Korea, Spain, Sweden, Turkey, United Kingdom and United States
- 19 October 2017: Bahrain, Kuwait, Qatar, Oman and United Arab Emirates

e-Visa

- 15 June 2015: All countries

Cancelled

- 4 October 2023: G20 countries

Visa facilitation agreement

- 21 August 2001: United States (5 years visa validity)

=== Non-ordinary passports ===
In addition, holders of diplomatic, official, service or special category passports of the following countries may enter without a visa:

- Angola^{D S}
- Benin^{D O S}
- Brazil^{D O S}
- Burkina Faso^{D O S}
- China^{D S 1}
- Cote d'Ivoire^{D O S}
- Cuba^{D O S}
- Djibouti^{D S}
- Egypt^{D O S}
- Ethiopia^{D S}
- France^{D S}
- Germany^{D}
- Guinea^{D O S}
- Iran^{D S 1}
- Mali^{D O S}
- Russia^{D S}
- Saint Kitts and Nevis^{D O S 1}
- Senegal^{D O S}
- Serbia^{D S}
- South Korea^{D S}
- Tunisia^{D O S Sp}
- Turkey^{D O S Sp}
- United Arab Emirates^{D O S Sp}

_{D - Diplomatic passports}
_{O - Diplomatic passports}
_{S - Service passports}
_{Sp - Special passports}
_{1 - 30 days}

Date of visa changes

Unknown: Angola, Iran, Niger, Saint Kitts and Nevis, Serbia, Singapore, United Arab Emirates

- 28 July 2004: Brazil
- 10 June 2006: Egypt
- 5 July 2007: France
- 29 February 2008: Guinea
- 18 March 2008: Mali
- 16 July 2009: Cuba
- 5 April 2010: Benin
- 17 August 2010: Ethiopia
- 5 April 2011: Russia
- 19 May 2011: Rwanda
- 7 November 2012: Burkina Faso
- 28 January 2013: Djibouti
- 7 June 2013: South Korea
- 26 June 2013: Germany
- 25 October 2014: Senegal
- 27 November 2014: Ivory Coast
- 1 December 2014: Tunisia
- 13 May 2015: Turkey
- 16 February 2016: China

- A visa exemption agreement for holders of diplomatic and official passports was signed with Togo on 25 September 2018, but it has not yet entered into force.

== Electronic visa (e-Visa) ==
Gabon announced the introduction of an electronic visa system for visitors in January 2015.

The e-Visa was introduced on 15 June 2015.

The e-Visa system is usable by citizens of any country that requires a visa to visit Gabon. The e-Visa is issued 72 hours after the application and is valid only for those arriving via Leon Mba International Airport in Libreville.

E-visas are granted for these durations:

- From one (1) to three (3) months single entry, the cost is 70 EUR or 45000 XAF + 15 EUR as file processing fee.
- For six (6) months with multiple entries which cost 185 EUR or 120000 XAF + 15 EUR as file processing fee.

== Transit without a visa ==
Transit without a visa is possible for travellers continuing their trip to a third country by the same or first connecting plane within 24 hours or by the same plane if they are the citizens of the following countries: Albania, Armenia, Azerbaijan, Belarus, Bulgaria, People's Republic of China, Czech Republic, Georgia, Hungary, Kazakhstan, Democratic People's Republic of Korea (North Korea), Kyrgyzstan, Moldova, Mongolia, Montenegro, Poland, Romania, Russia, Serbia, Slovakia, Tajikistan, Turkmenistan, Ukraine, Uzbekistan and Vietnam. Not allowed for the citizens of Lebanon.

== Admission restrictions ==
- Lebanon - Citizens of Lebanon are specifically required to hold an "Authorisation to enter Gabon" (Autorisation d'entree au Gabon) in addition to a visa in order to enter Gabon.
- United States - Following the United States visa issuance suspension on Gabonese citizens, on 1 January 2026, Gabon also imposed a reciprocal visa issuance suspension on United States citizens.

== See also ==
- Visa requirements for Gabonese citizens
