= Gabon–United Kingdom relations =

- Gabon: United Kingdom

Diplomatic mission
- High Commission of Gabon, London: Honorary Consul of the United Kingdom, Libreville

Gabon and the United Kingdom established diplomatic relations on 9 December 1960.

Both countries share common membership of the Atlantic Co-operation Pact, Commonwealth, the International Criminal Court, and the World Trade Organization.

== Diplomatic missions ==
- Gabon maintains a high commission in London.
- The United Kingdom is accredited to Gabon through an honorary consul in Libreville.

== See also ==
- Foreign relations of Gabon
- Foreign relations of the United Kingdom
