= List of diplomatic missions in Gabon =

This article lists the diplomatic missions in Gabon. The capital Libreville hosts 35 embassies/high commissions.

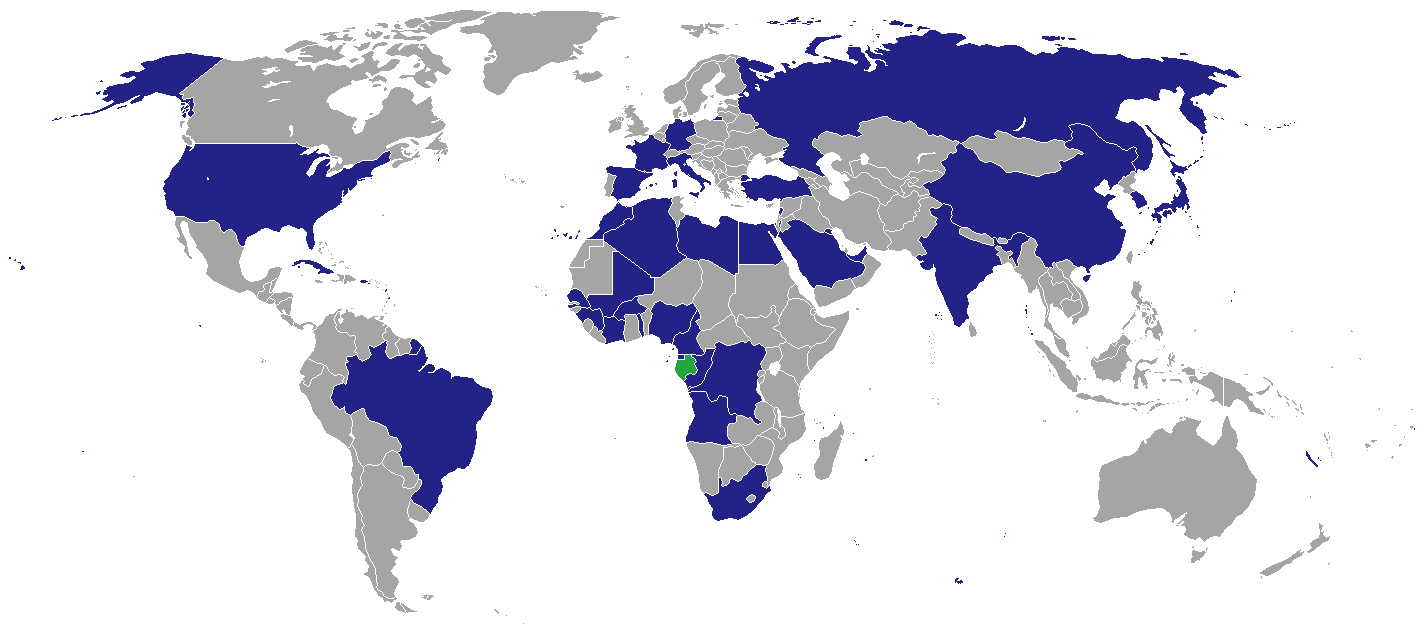
Diplomatic missions in Gabon

== Diplomatic missions in Libreville ==
=== Embassies/High Commissions ===
Entries marked with an asterisk (*) are member-states of the Commonwealth of Nations. As such, their embassies are formally termed as "high commissions".

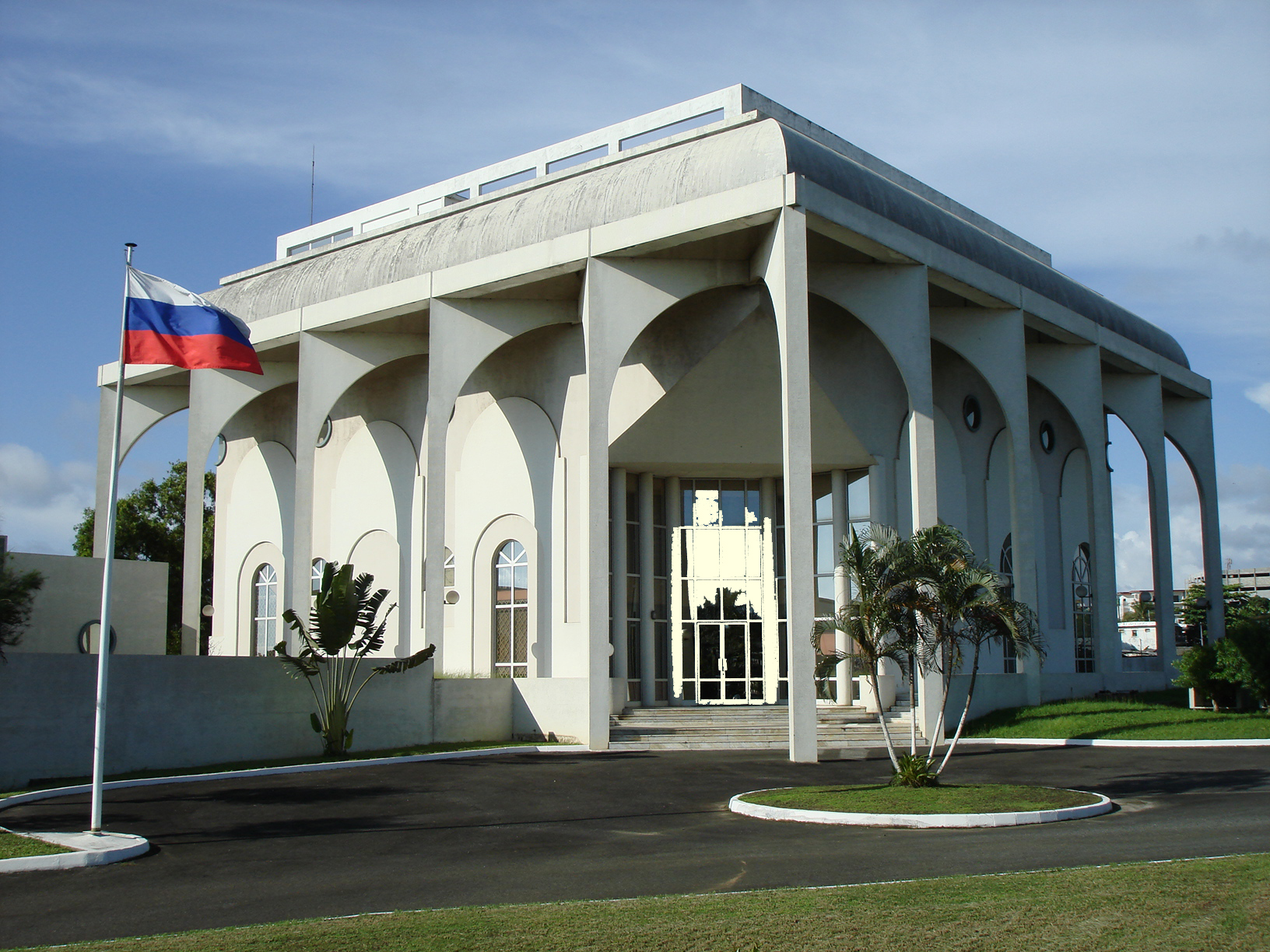
Embassy of Russia in Libreville

1. Algeria
2. Angola
3. Brazil
4. Burkina Faso
5. Cameroon*
6. Central African Republic
7. China
8. Congo-Brazzaville
9. Congo-Kinshasa
10. Cuba
11. Egypt
12. Equatorial Guinea
13. France
14. Germany
15. Guinea
16. India*
17. Italy
18. Ivory Coast
19. Japan
20. Lebanon
21. Libya
22. Mali
23. Morocco
24. Nigeria*
25. Russia
26. São Tomé and Príncipe
27. Saudi Arabia
28. Senegal
29. South Africa*
30. South Korea
31. Spain
32. Togo*
33. Turkey
34. United Arab Emirates
35. United States

=== Other missions in Libreville ===
- European Union (Delegation)

== Consular missions ==
=== Oyem ===
- Equatorial Guinea (Consulate-General)

=== Franceville ===
- Congo-Brazzaville (Consulate-General)

== Non-resident embassies ==
=== Resident in Abuja, Nigeria ===
- Argentina
- Australia
- Austria
- Benin
- Czechia
- Denmark
- Hungary
- Ireland
- Malaysia
- Mauritania
- Mexico
- Philippines
- Qatar
- Romania
- Syria
- Slovakia
- Thailand
- Ukraine

=== Resident in Kinshasa, Congo-Kinshasa ===
- Burundi
- Ethiopia
- Greece
- Iran
- Kenya
- Norway
- Sweden
- Switzerland
- Tanzania
- Uganda
- Zambia

=== Resident in Luanda, Angola ===
- Poland
- Serbia

=== Resident in Rabat, Morocco ===
- Croatia
- Kazakhstan
- Vietnam

=== Resident in Yaoundé, Cameroon ===
- Belgium
- Canada
- Indonesia
- Israel
- Tunisia
- United Kingdom

=== Resident elsewhere ===
- Bangladesh (Algiers)
- Chile (New York)
- Colombia (Pretoria)
- Holy See (Brazzaville)
- Netherlands (Cotonou)
- Madagascar (Addis Ababa)
- Portugal (São Tomé)
- Rwanda (Brazzaville)
- Seychelles (Addis Ababa)
- Sovereign Military Order of Malta (Paris)
- Venezuela (Malabo)
- Yemen (Addis Ababa)

== Closed missions ==
Host city	Sending country	Mission	Year closed	Ref.
Libreville	Argentina	Embassy (Note: Resident in Abuja, Nigeria)	1993	
Libreville	Benin	Consulate-General (Note: Originally an embassy, it was downgraded into a consulate-general in the midst of a reduction of Beninese missions in 2016.)	2020	
Libreville	Chile	Embassy (Note: Resident in New York City, USA)	1989	
Libreville	Kuwait	Embassy	2024	
Libreville	North Korea	Embassy	Unknown	
Libreville	Philippines	Embassy	Unknown	
Libreville	Romania	Embassy	Unknown	
Libreville	Ukraine	Embassy	2012	
Libreville	United Kingdom	Embassy (Note: Resident in Yaounde, Cameroon)	1991/2	
Libreville	Uruguay	Embassy	1989	

== See also ==
- Foreign relations of Gabon
- List of diplomatic missions of Gabon
