= Gabonese nationality law =

Gabonese Nationality Code

Parliament of Gabon
- Long title: Code de la nationalité gabonaise, Loi No. 37-1998
- Enacted by: Government of Gabon
- Status: Current legislation

Gabonese nationality law is regulated by the Constitution of Gabon, as amended; the Gabonese Nationality Code, and its revisions; and various international agreements to which the country is a signatory. These laws determine who is, or is eligible to be, a national of Gabon. The legal means to acquire nationality, formal legal membership in a nation, differ from the domestic relationship of rights and obligations between a national and the nation, known as citizenship. Nationality describes the relationship of an individual to the state under international law, whereas citizenship is the domestic relationship of an individual within the nation. Gabonese nationality is typically obtained under the principle of jus soli, i.e. by birth in Gabon, or of jus sanguinis, born to parents with Gabonese nationality. It can be granted to persons with an affiliation to the country, or to a permanent resident who has lived in the country for a given period of time through naturalization.

== Acquisition of nationality ==
Nationality can be acquired in Gabon at birth or later in life through naturalization.

=== By birth ===
Those who acquire nationality at birth include:

- Children born anywhere who have at least one parent who is a Gabonese national of origin; (Note: Illegitimate children born to a Gabonese mother abroad must be registered with consular or registry authorities to establish parentage.)
- Children born in Gabon who would otherwise be stateless; or
- Abandoned children or orphans discovered in the territory whose parents are unknown, but assumed to be Gabonese.

=== By naturalization ===
Naturalization can be granted to persons who have resided in the territory for a sufficient period of time to confirm they understand the customs and traditions of the society. General provisions are that applicants have good character and conduct; have no criminal convictions; no serious physical or mental incapacity; and are invested in Gabon. Applicants must typically have resided in the country for five years. Besides foreigners meeting the criteria, other persons who may be naturalized include:

- Children born to foreign nationals in Gabon may apply for nationality at majority;
- Children born in countries neighboring Gabonese territory or who have been raised by Gabonese nationals and resided in the territory for ten years, can opt for Gabonese nationality of origin in the year prior to reaching majority;
- The spouse of a Gabonese national after three years of marriage;
- Adoptees whose parents are Gabonese automatically acquire nationality upon completion of the legal adoption process;
- Minor children can be automatically naturalized when their parent acquires nationality; or
- Persons who have provided exceptional service to the nation may naturalize without other conditions.

== Loss of nationality ==
Gabonese nationals can renounce their nationality pending approval by the state. Nationals may be denaturalized in Gabon for committing serious crimes; committing crimes against the state or state security; or for fraud, misrepresentation, or concealment in a naturalization petition. Persons who previously had nationality and wish to repatriate must establish residency in the country and apply for reinstatement.

== Dual nationality ==
Dual nationality has been allowed in Gabon since 1962; however, the president is required to be a Gabonese of origin descended of four generations of Gabonese ancestors.

== History ==
=== Portuguese, African kingdoms period (1474–1839) ===
In 1472 Portuguese sailor, Lopes Gonçalves sighted the Gabon Estuary and continued exploring southward from modern-day Libreville to the cape which bears his name, arriving in 1473 or 1474. Prior to the involvement of Europeans, the Pygmy- and Bantu-speaking people who had settled in the region did not share a language or develop a common political system. Instead, the mobile societies, which migrated within a few decades, were organized in a clan-based system. A village headman, who had distinguished himself through prowess in battle, hunting, trade, or rituals was at the top of the social hierarchy. Below him were his dependents, allies, and slaves. Wealth was derived by controlling people, trading wives and dependents as commodities to increase power. By 1600, conflicts had arisen with European trading networks and British, Dutch, and French merchants were trading in the region for slaves and ivory. These encounters transformed the coastal communities into mercantile centers within centralized kingdoms.

By 1700, the Kingdom of Orungu was operating near Cape Lopez and began to dominate the trade in beeswax, copal, dye materials, ebony, and ivory. By 1760, the Orungu were engaged in the slave trade, but primarily as purchasers of slaves from the Dutch, rather than sellers of slaves. They increasingly implemented taxation schemes and by the mid-eighteenth century had become one of the dominant kingdoms of the coast. The Mpongwe chiefs, who had been pushed to their north, in the Gabon Estuary during the previous century, were actively engaged as middlemen between trading networks. Vying for control of key trading outposts, the African kingdoms came into conflict with each other, forcing some of the clans to move inward from the coast to take refuge in more remote forested areas. At the turn of the nineteenth century, Brazilian, Portuguese and Spanish slave traders increased their involvement in the slave trade as the British, Dutch, and French withdrew. Both British and French patrol boats guarded the coast to protect trade routes and halt slaving.

=== French period (1839–1960) ===
In 1839, French admiral, Édouard Bouët-Willaumez, signed a commercial treaty with the headmen along the coast hoping to gain benefits of trade as well as agricultural land to be developed. Continuing with treaty making over the next several years, he signed treaties with most of the headmen in the Gabon Estuary. In 1848, Bouët-Willaumez established the foundations of Libreville and the following year brought a group of slaves liberated from a Dutch ship to work as wage laborers on the nearby plantations. The site would become the first colonial capital and military outpost in Gabon. By 1885, the slave trade had been replaced by commerce in dye-making plants, ivory, and rubber. Pierre Savorgnan de Brazza was appointed commissioner general of France's possessions of French Congo and Gabon in 1886. In 1891, the two colonies were incorporated into one entity and in 1894 de Brazza granted a large concession to the French trading house of Daumas Béraud and the Societe du Haut Ogooué (Society of Upper Ogooué) in Gabon, granting them a monopoly on trade in exchange for governing the region. De Brazza left the Congo in 1897, but his successors continued using corporate trade concessions to manage affairs in the French possessions licensing forty companies. On 29 December 1903, France issued a decree placing Gabon, Moyen-Congo (Middle Congo, the previous colony of French Congo), the newly established territories of Ubangi-Shari and Chad under French Congo's commissioner general at Brazzaville. Gabon was granted a lieutenant-governor in Libreville to oversee its administration. In 1910, these colonies were federated into French Equatorial Africa.

In 1848, slavery was abolished throughout the French Empire and the Civil Code was extended to all of the French citizens in the colonies. Under the Civil Code, women were legally incapacitated and paternal authority was established over their children. Upon marriage, a woman married to a French man automatically acquired the same nationality as her spouse. Illegitimate children were barred from inheritance and nationality could only be transmitted through a father. Non-citizen nationals were governed by traditional laws concerning marriage and inheritance which placed the well-being of the community above individual rights. These laws prevented a wife from being treated as a slave, required her husband to support her, and entitled her kin to a bride price, to compensate them for the loss of her fertility to their kinship group and secure the legality of the union. Having paid the price for the marriage contract, she and her offspring belonged to the kinship network of her husband and could be inherited if her husband died.

The French Nationality Law of 1889 codified previous statutory laws, changing the French standard from jus sanguinis to jus soli and was extended to the French West Indies. Under its terms, women who would become stateless by the rule to acquire their spouse's nationality were allowed to retain their French nationality upon marriage. The Nationality Law was modified in 1897 when it was extended to the remainder of the French colonies. Clarification in the 1897 decree included that bestowing nationality by birth in French territory only applied to children born in France, restoring descent requirements for the colonies. Under the Code de l'indigénat (Code of Indigenous Status) promulgated for Algeria in 1881 and extended to French Equatorial Africa in 1910, nationals in the new colonies followed customary law. On 23 May 1912, a decree was issued specifically addressing the status of French Equatorial Africans. Under its terms, native persons born in Equatorial Africa were nationals of France but not citizens and were subject to the Indigenous Code. Upon reaching the age of twenty-one, they could be naturalized; however, the law was explicit that neither a wife nor the children of a naturalized Equatorial African automatically derived his French nationality. Only if the spouses were married under French law and the children registered in the Civil Registry could they acquire the status of the husband or father. (Note: Yerri Urban, a public law lecturer at the University of the French Antilles notes that at the time the law went into effect, there were no provisions to allow native Africans to register births in the European Civil Registry.) To naturalize Equatorial Africans had to be able to both read and write French and had to have served in the French military service or have been decorated with the Legion of Honor.

Following the end of World War I France passed a law, "Décret N°. 24 on 25 March 1915 that allowed subjects or protected persons who were non-citizen nationals and had established domicile in a French territory to acquire full citizenship, including the naturalization of their wives and minor children, by having received the cross of the Legion of Honor, having obtained a university degree, having rendered service to the nation, having attained the rank of an officer or received a medal from the French army, who had married a Frenchwoman and established a one-year residency; or who had resided for more than ten years in a colony other than their country of origin. A 14 January 1918 decree written for Equatorial Africa and French West Africa was aimed to provide naturalization for decorated veterans of the war and their families, providing they had not previously been denied their rights nor participated in actions against French rule.

In 1927, France passed a new Nationality Law, which under Article 8, removed the requirement for married women to automatically derive the nationality of a husband and provided that her nationality could only be changed if she consented to change her nationality. It also allowed children born in France to native-born French women married to foreigners to acquire their nationality from their mothers. When it was implemented it included Guadeloupe, Martinique and Réunion but was extended to the remaining French possessions for French citizens only in 1928. Under Article 26 of the 1928 decree was the stipulation that it did not apply to natives of the French possessions except in Algeria, Guadeloupe, Martinique, and Réunion. A decade later, the legal incapacity of married women was finally invalidated for French citizens. In 1939, France determined that marriage and inheritance were too significant to continue being dealt with in native courts. That year, the Mandel Decree was enacted in French West Africa as well as French Equatorial Africa. Under its terms child marriage was discouraged. It established the minimum age at marriage as fourteen for women and sixteen for men, invalidated marriages wherein spouses did not consent, and nullified levirate marriage without approval of the woman.

At the end of World War II, a statute issued on 7 March 1944 granted French citizenship to those who had performed services to the nation, such as serving as civil servants or receiving recognitions. The Constitution of 1946 granted French citizenship to all subjects of France's territories without having to renounce their personal status as natives. Under its terms, Moyen-Congo was classified as an Overseas Territory within the French Union. In 1945, a new Code of French Nationality was passed, which conferred once again automatic French nationality on foreign wives of French men, but allowed mothers who were French nationals to pass their nationality to children born outside of France. It expressly applied to Algeria, French Guiana, Guadeloupe, Martinique and Réunion and was extended to the Overseas Territories in 1953, but in the case of the latter had distinctions for the rights of those who were naturalized.

In 1951 the Jacquinot Decree strengthened the provisions in French West and Equatorial Africa of the Mandel decree removing women who were twenty-one years old, or divorced, from control by a father or guardian and establishing specific rules for the payment and determining the amount of a bride price. In 1958, French Equatorial Africa was dissolved under pressure for autonomy by the African colonies and the French Congo gained self-governance within the French Community. With the passage of the 1958 French Constitution, nationality provisions were standardized for France, Overseas Departments, and Overseas Territories. Article 86 excluded the possibility for independence of the colonies. The French Constitution was amended on 1960 to allow states to maintain membership in the Community even if they were independent republics. In July 1960, negotiations in Paris set terms for independence and a transfer of power.

=== Post-independence (1960–present) ===
Gabon attained its independence on 17 August 1960. Those who acquired Gabonese nationality on that date included any person domiciled in Gabon including their children and spouse. However, those not born in Gabon had to apply for confirmation by registering with the head of state their intent to remain in Gabon. On 2 March 1962, the Gabonese Nationality Code (Loi No. 89-61) came into effect. It proclaimed that after independence, nationality was acquired by being born to at least one parent of Gabonese origin, unless one of the parents had diplomatic immunity. The law required foreign women to acquire the nationality of her Gabonese spouse upon marriage, unless before or during the ceremony she declared an intent to retain her nationality of origin. It did not require Gabonese women marrying foreigners to lose their nationality upon marriage, but allowed them to renounce their nationality in favor of that of their husband. Under its provisions dual nationality was permitted. Article 10, was modified in 1965 by ordinance (No. 25/PR) to provide nationality for those who at independence were not domiciled in Gabon, but were born to Gabonese parents. Article 40 was amended in 1968 via ordinance (No. 35/68) to provide for fees to process naturalization and denaturalization petitions, and Article 24 was amended (Loi No. 5-73) in 1973.

The 1962 Nationality Code was repealed in 1998 with the passage of a new nationality code (Loi No. 37-1998). Basic acquisition of nationality at birth did not change and was acquired from having Gabonese parentage. The new law contained a provision that children who were born in bordering states, who had been living with a Gabonese parent prior to their fifteenth birthday or were receiving state assistance and had resided in Gabon for 10 years, could acquire Gabonese nationality by declaration in the year before reaching majority. It contains gender discrimination in that for children born out of wedlock and abroad to Gabonese mothers, nationality can only be acquired by completing an administrative process, which is not required of children born in the same circumstances to Gabonese fathers. However, the 1998 Nationality Code allows spouses to equally attain nationality from their Gabonese husband or wife.
