= List of high commissioners of Gabon to Canada =

Coordinates: 45.428321°N 75.674452°W

High Commissioner of Gabon to Canada
- Inaugural holder: Aristide Issembe
- Formation: 1971

The Gabonese High Commissioner in Ottawa is the official representative of the Government in Libreville to the Government of Canada.

== List of representatives ==
=== Ambassadors ===
Diplomatic agrément	Ambassador	Observations	List of presidents of Gabon	List of prime ministers of Canada	Term end
1971	Aristide Issembe		Omar Bongo	Pierre Trudeau	1972
1972	Lubin-Martial Ntoutoume Obame		Omar Bongo	Pierre Trudeau	1974
1974	Léonard Ndong Nze		Omar Bongo	Pierre Trudeau	1976
1976	Jean-Félix Oyoue		Omar Bongo	Pierre Trudeau	1979
1979	Hubert Ondias-Souna		Omar Bongo	Joe Clark	1981
1981	Jean-Claude Labouba		Omar Bongo	Pierre Trudeau	1984
1985	Simon Ombegue		Omar Bongo	Brian Mulroney	1990
1990	Jean-Robert Odzaga		Omar Bongo	Brian Mulroney	1993
1994	Alphonse Oyabi-Gnala		Omar Bongo	Jean Chrétien	2004
2004	Joseph Obiang Ndoutoume	On November 16, 1995, for example, the KCNA reported that the new Gabonese Ambassador to the DPRK, Joseph Obiang Ndoutoume, presented his credentials to Vice President Li Chong-ok at the Mansudae Assembly Hall.	Omar Bongo	Paul Martin	2008
2008	Andre William Anguile		Omar Bongo	Stephen Harper	2010
2010	Sosthène Ngokila		Ali-Ben Bongo Ondimba	Stephen Harper	2010
2011	François Ebibi Mba,		Ali Bongo Ondimba	Stephen Harper	2015
March 22, 2016	Sosthène Ngokila		Ali Bongo Ondimba	Stephen Harper	2023

=== High Commissioners ===
1. Sosthène Ngokila
